= Baddeley =

Baddeley is a surname. Notable people with the surname include:

- Aaron Baddeley, Australian-American golfer
- Alan Baddeley, English professor of psychology
  - Baddeley's model of working memory
- Angela Baddeley, English actress
- Gavin Baddeley, English reverend and journalist
- Herbert Baddeley, English tennis player
- Hermione Baddeley, British actress
- Frederick Henry Baddeley, geologist
- Jack Baddeley, Australian politician
- John Baddeley (disambiguation)
- John F. Baddeley, British scholar and journalist
- Jon Baddeley, English auctioneer
- Lee Baddeley, Welsh footballer
- M. J. B. Baddeley, English guidebook writer
- Rex Baddeley (born 1941), New Zealand cricketer
- Robert Baddeley (actor), English actor
- Sophia Baddeley, English actress
- Steve Baddeley, English badminton player
- Thomas Baddeley (priest)
- Tom Baddeley, English footballer
- Wilfred Baddeley, English tennis player

== See also ==
- Baddeley Devesi, Solomon Islander politician
- Baddeleyite, a mineral
- Badeley
