= Badeley =

Badeley is a surname. Notable people with the surname include:

- Cecil Badeley (1896–1986), New Zealand rugby footballer
- Edward Badeley (c. 1803–1868), English ecclesiastical lawyer
- Henry Badeley, 1st Baron Badeley (1874–1951), English Baron and civil servant
- John Carr Badeley (1794–1851), English medical doctor
- Sydney Badeley (1902–1981), New Zealand cricketer
- Victor Ivan Badeley (1898–1971), New Zealand rugby footballer

== See also ==
- Baddeley
