= Thomas Baddeley =

Thomas Baddeley may refer to:

- Tom Baddeley (1874–1946), English international footballer
- Thomas Baddeley (priest) (1786/87–1823), author and Catholic priest
