= Auckland Grammar School =

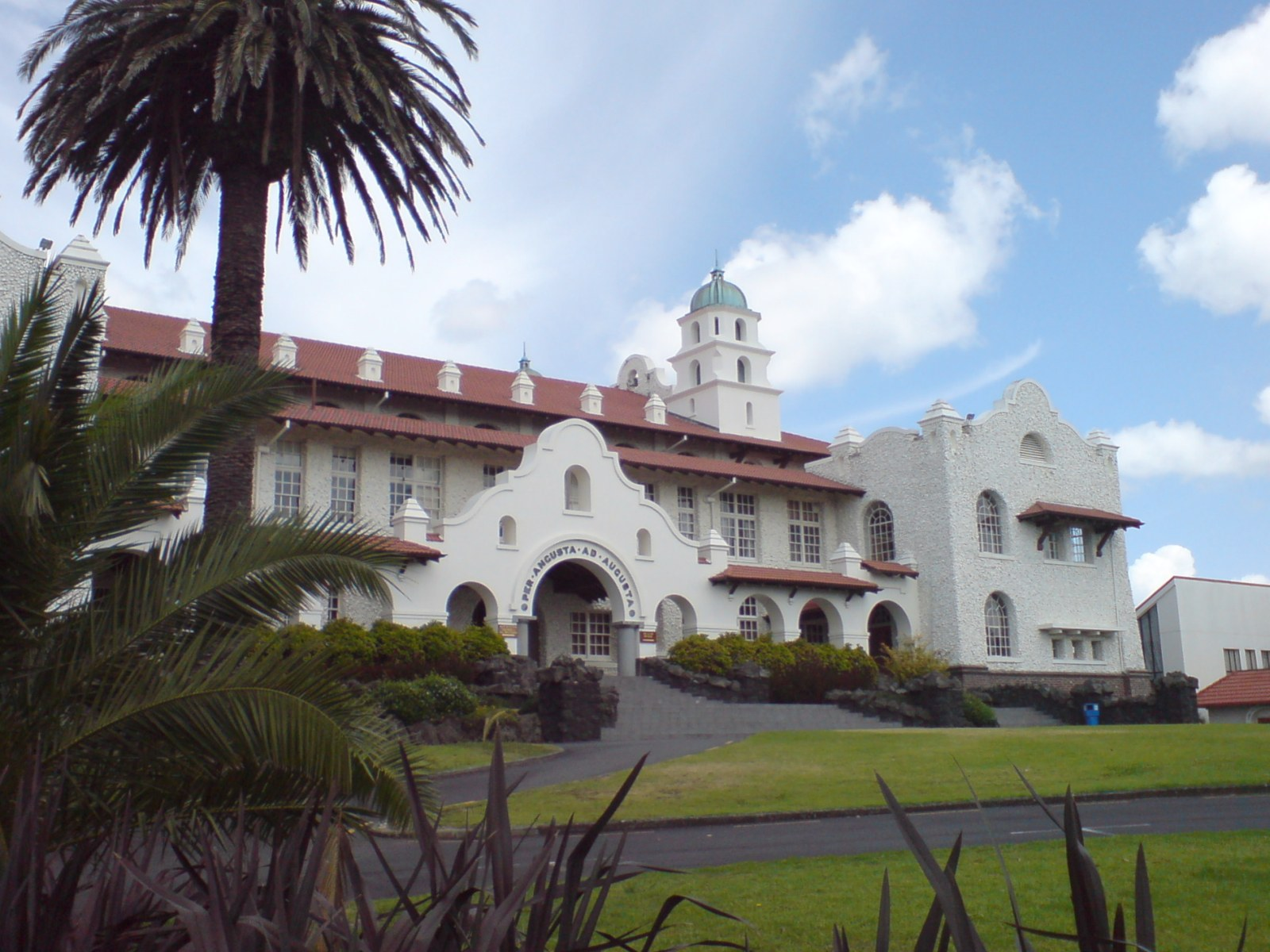
- The school is built in Spanish Mission style architecture.

Location
- Mountain Road, Epsom; Auckland, 1023; New Zealand; 36°52′9″S 174°46′10″E

Information
- Other names: AGS; Auckland Grammar; Grammar
- Type: State, day and boarding secondary school
- Motto: Latin: Per Angusta ad Augusta (Through difficulties to greatness)
- Established: 1869; 157 years ago
- Sister school: Epsom Girls' Grammar School
- Ministry of Education Institution no.: 54
- Headmaster: Tim O'Connor
- Years: 9–13
- Gender: Boys
- Enrolment: 2,767 (July 2026)
- Colours: Navy blue and gold
- Socio-economic decile: 9
- Alumni: Old Grammar Boys
- Website: www.ags.school.nz

Auckland Grammar School (AGS, simply referred to as Auckland Grammar, or Grammar) is a state, day and boarding secondary school for boys in Auckland, New Zealand. Established in 1869, it has produced more national rugby team members than any other school in New Zealand, and 26 Rhodes Scholars to Oxford University.

The school was originally situated on Howe Street in Freeman's Bay, where Auckland Girls Grammar School is now located. It moved to its current site on Mountain Road in Epsom in 1916. As of 2020, it has 2606 students, making it the third largest school in New Zealand. The current headmaster, Tim O’Connor, was appointed in 2012.

== History ==
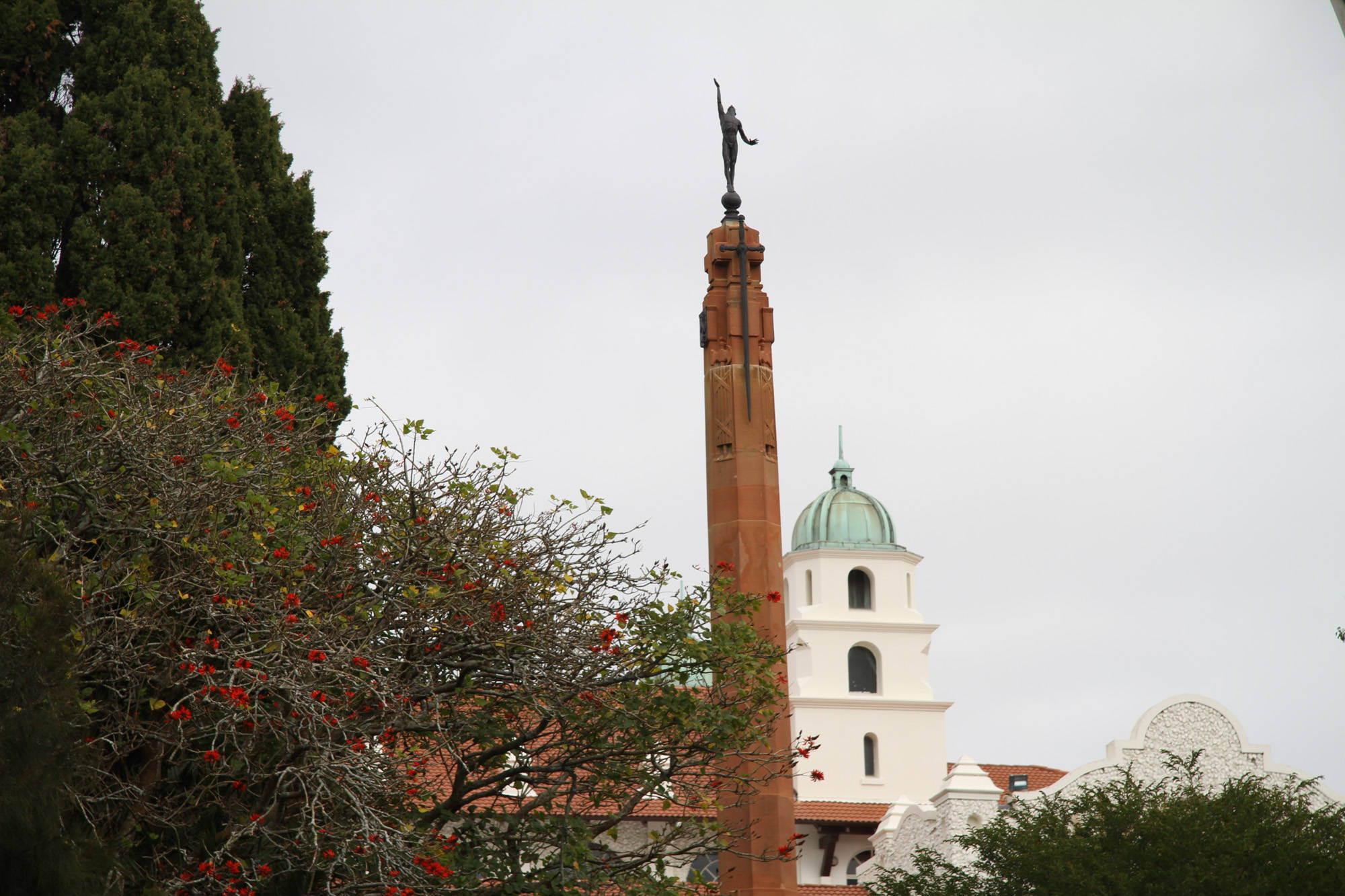
The War Memorial at Auckland Grammar School

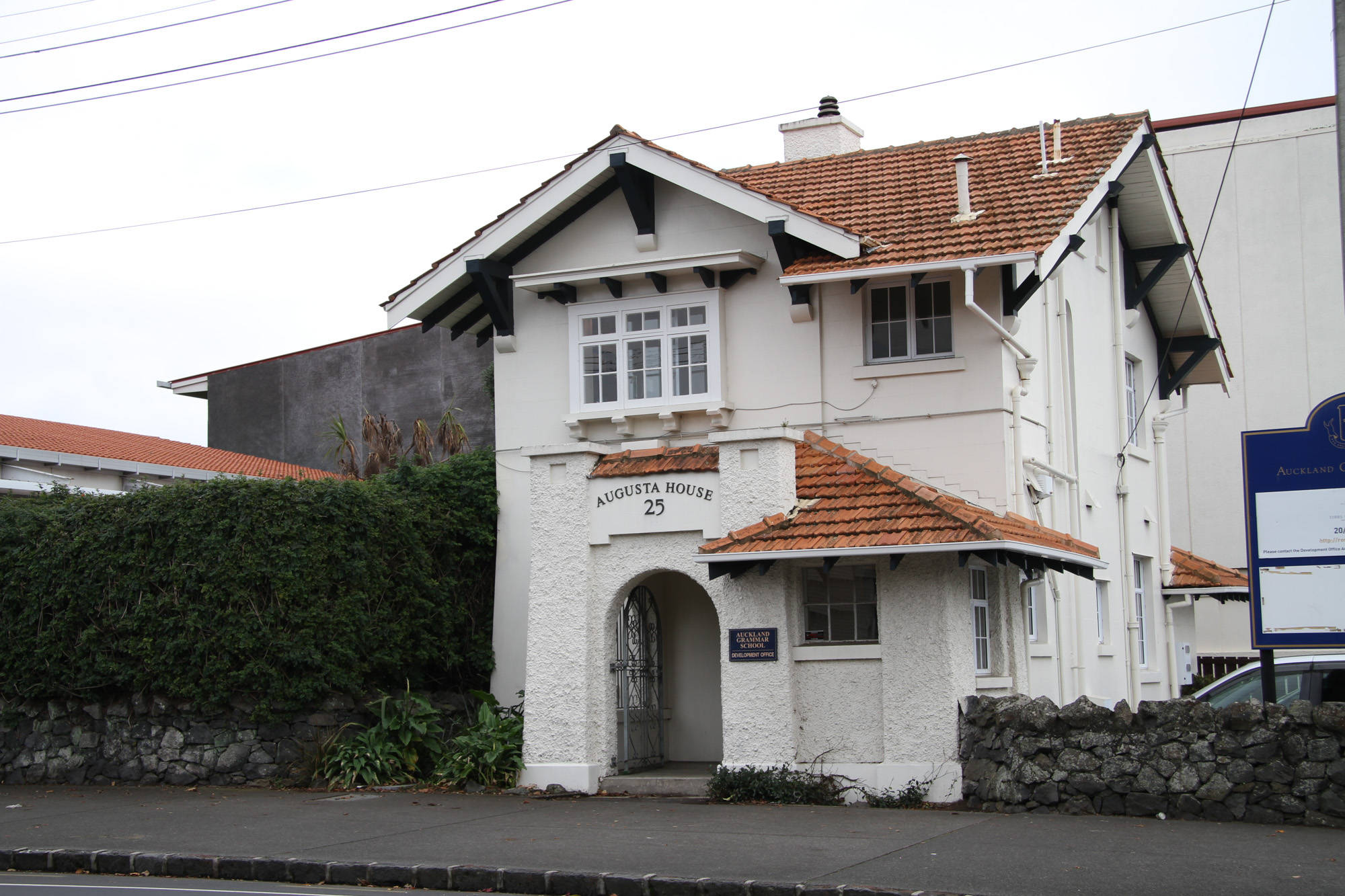
Augusta House, the former caretaker's house at Auckland Grammar School

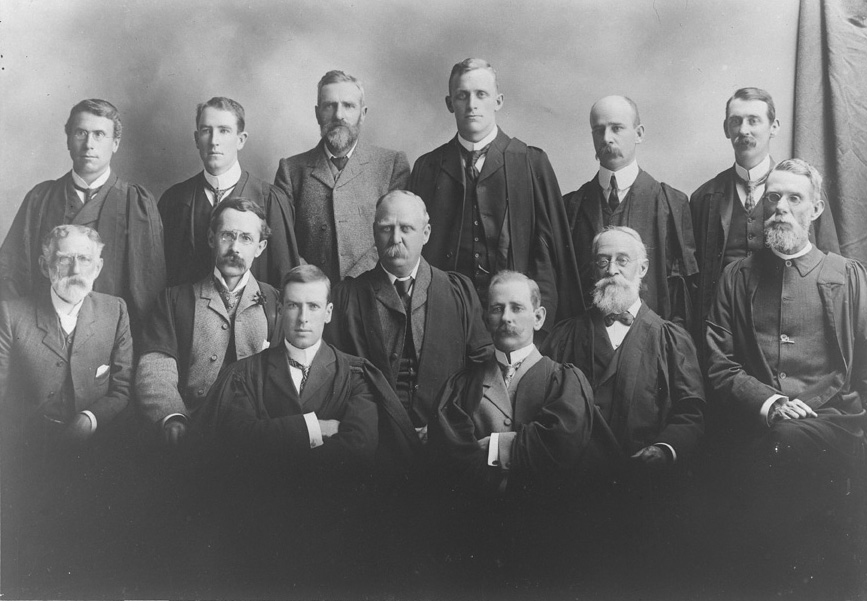
Auckland Grammar School staff members in 1903

Auckland Grammar School was endowed in 1850 by the then Governor of New Zealand, Sir George Grey.

Grey, during his times as governor in South Africa, Australia and New Zealand is also associated with the establishment of other educational institutions such as Whanganui Collegiate School in Whanganui, New Zealand, Grey College in Bloemfontein, South Africa, and Grey High School in Port Elizabeth, South Africa.

Auckland Grammar was recognised as an educational establishment in 1868 through the Grammar School Appropriation Act. It officially opened in 1869 in the old Immigration Barracks site on Howe Street with 78 boys enrolled. The school was initially privately funded, as New Zealand did not have a state education system until 1877.

A growing roll caused the school to move twice in the 1870s, and in 1880, it moved to Symonds Street, where it remained for 35 years. The site today houses the University of Auckland's School of Architecture. Due to the economic impact of the 1880s depression, girls from Girls High School joined what was by then called the Auckland College and Grammar School. In 1909, Auckland Girls Grammar School opened on the original Howe Street site, and the renamed Auckland Grammar School became an all-boys school again. In 1916, the school moved to its current location in Mountain Road, Epsom, which was opened by Governor General Arthur Foljambe the Earl of Liverpool.

Auckland Grammar School buildings contain two Category I historic places, the school's main block and a war memorial, and one Category II historic place, the former janitor's house. An obelisk located in front of the school commemorates former students who fought in various wars. The school's main block, built in 1916 in the Spanish Mission style, is used for daily assemblies and exhibitions, and it also contains classrooms on its two levels. Surrounding the main hall in which students sit for daily assemblies are the school honours boards, listing the names of the school's top scholars.

In the early 20th century, inmates from the neighbouring Mount Eden Prison worked at two stone quarries adjacent to the school and were involved in the construction of the 1916 school building itself. Early prisoners were used as labourers to quarry stone for use in road construction around Auckland, including the quarries at Maungawhau / Mount Eden and Auckland Grammar School. The flat land was redeveloped into sports fields for Auckland Grammar School.

The school owns a facility called the VentureLodge located in the township of Ohakune, in the central North Island, which is used by students for camps.

The school's motto is in Latin: Per Angusta ad Augusta, which translates to "Through difficulties to greatness". The school has also translated the motto as "Through rough ravines to hallowed heights." The origin of the motto is uncertain, but it was a common maxim at the time of the school's founding.

A documentary on the school titled Grammar Boys was aired in July 2005 on TV3.

== Architecture ==
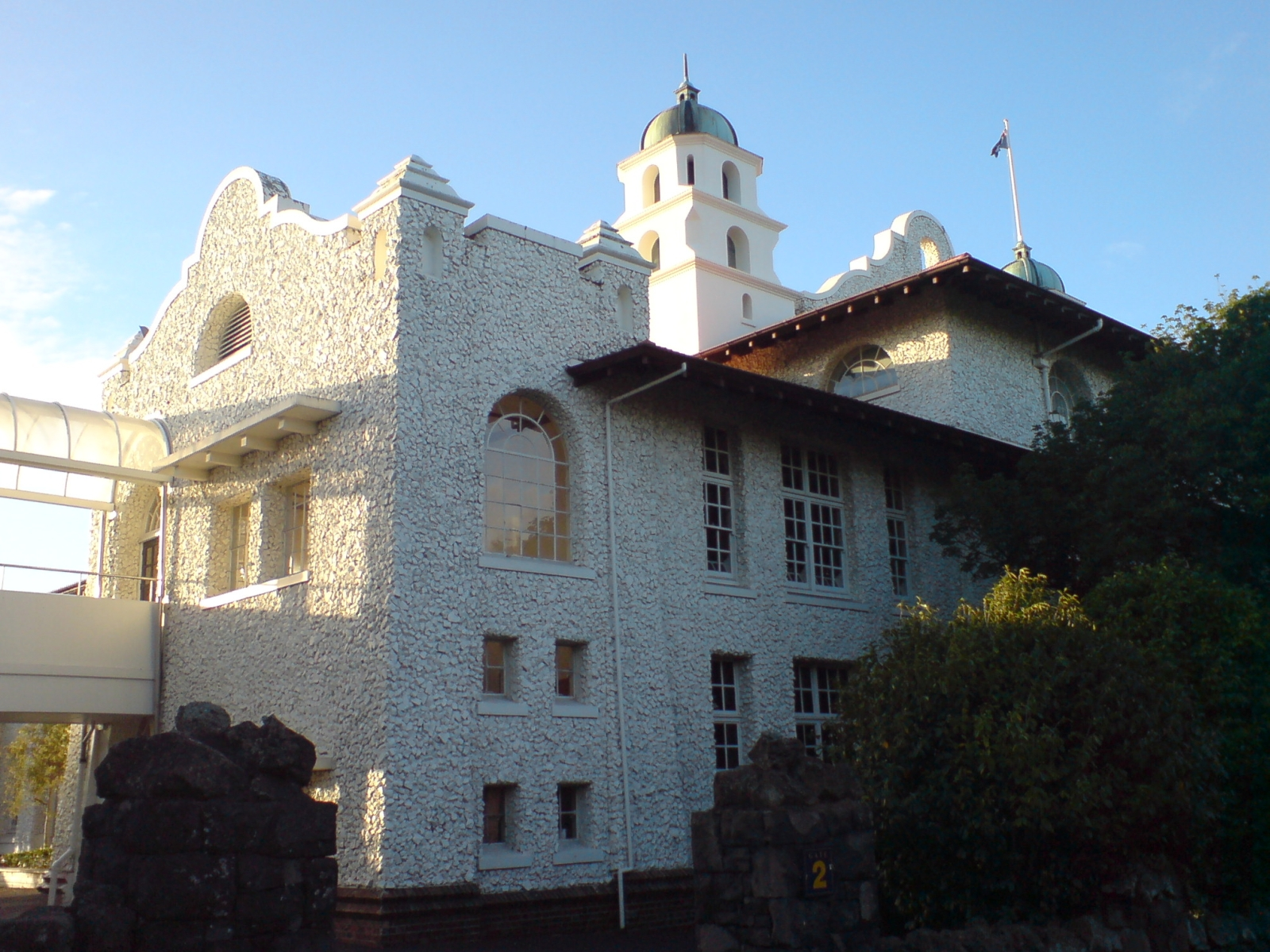
A view of the main building.

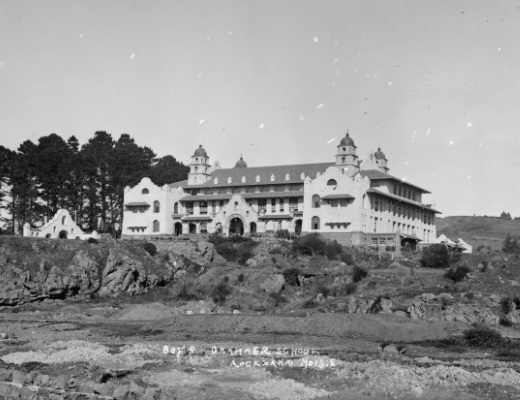
The main building shortly after its completion in 1916

The main building was constructed in 1916, designed by the architectural firm of Arnold & Abbott. It and the adjacent caretaker's residence are designed in the Spanish Mission style. Following the completion of the main building, three smaller buildings were constructed in the same style; the library block to the north, the gymnasium to the south and a toilet block adjoining the main building. The main building is listed by Heritage New Zealand as a Category I Historic Place.

In the 1950s, a large science block was constructed to the south of the main block in a modern style with metal windows. Further to the south again is a concrete block built in the early 1970s, raised on pilotis to give access to the upper playing fields. Between it and the 1920 gymnasium is a large gymnasium which was constructed in the mid-1970s and opened by then Prime Minister Robert Muldoon.

Adjacent to the Spanish Mission-style library from the 1920s is the Centennial Theatre (opened 1969) and the swimming pool. This abuts the Motorway, the construction of which, in the 1960s, removed some of the School's land to the north. Between the 1970s and 2014–2015, a complex of 'prefabs' adjacent to the Mountain Road boundary evolved, built to house the increasing roll. Following the development of a new classroom block in 2015, these have now been almost entirely removed. The loss of playing space on the upper part of the school property meant new sports fields needed to be created in two former quarries at a lower level than the original school. Each has a sports pavilion. The pavilion on the upper field was rebuilt soon after.

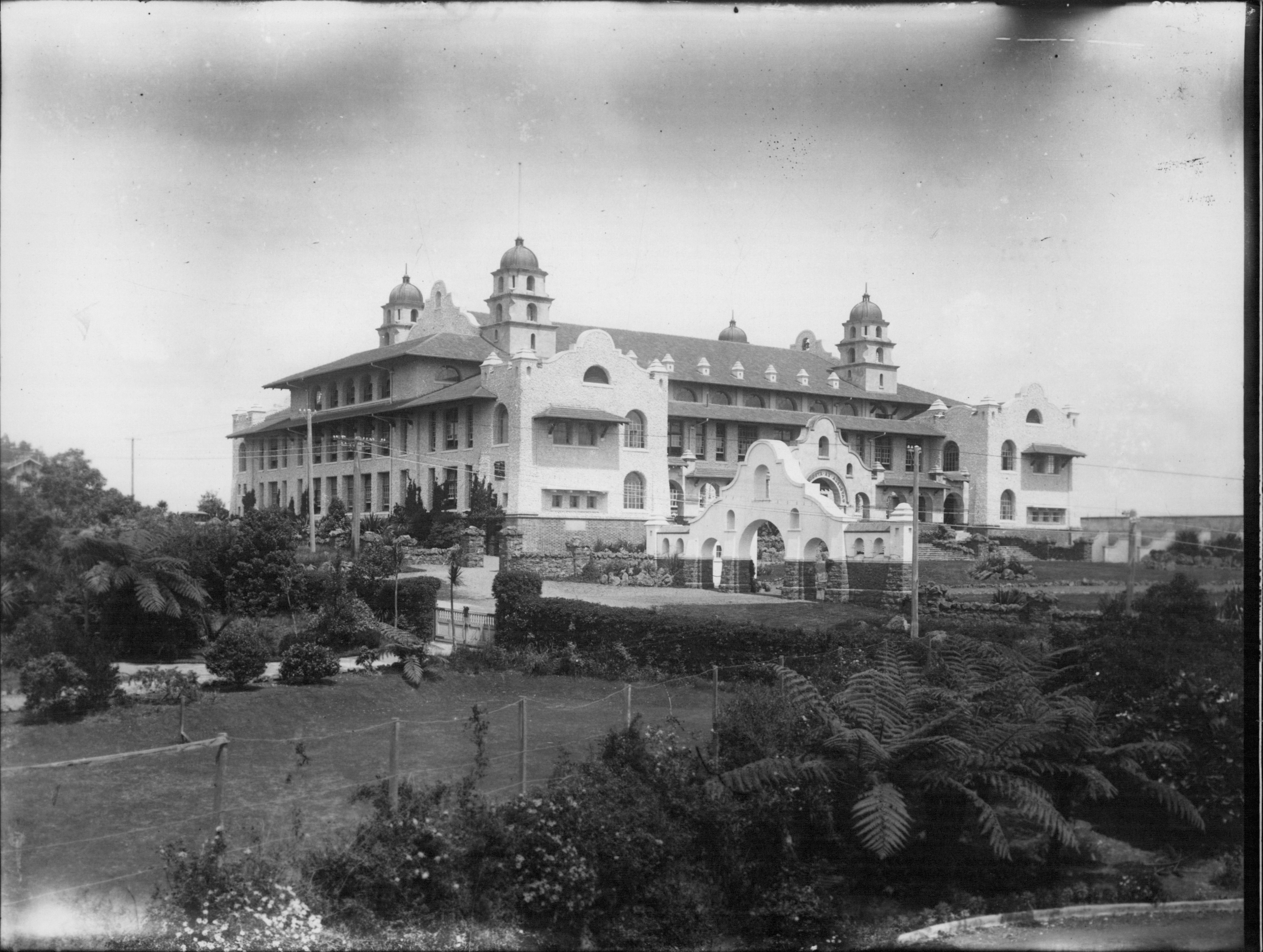
Auckland Grammar School in 1920

Between 2014 and 2015, the toilet block adjoining the main building was demolished and a new building constructed in its place for classroom use.

The school, for its 150th century anniversary capital project, built Te Ara Matauranga. Te Ara includes a new library, swimming pool and study block located between the Centennial Theatre and the War Memorial.

== Enrolment ==
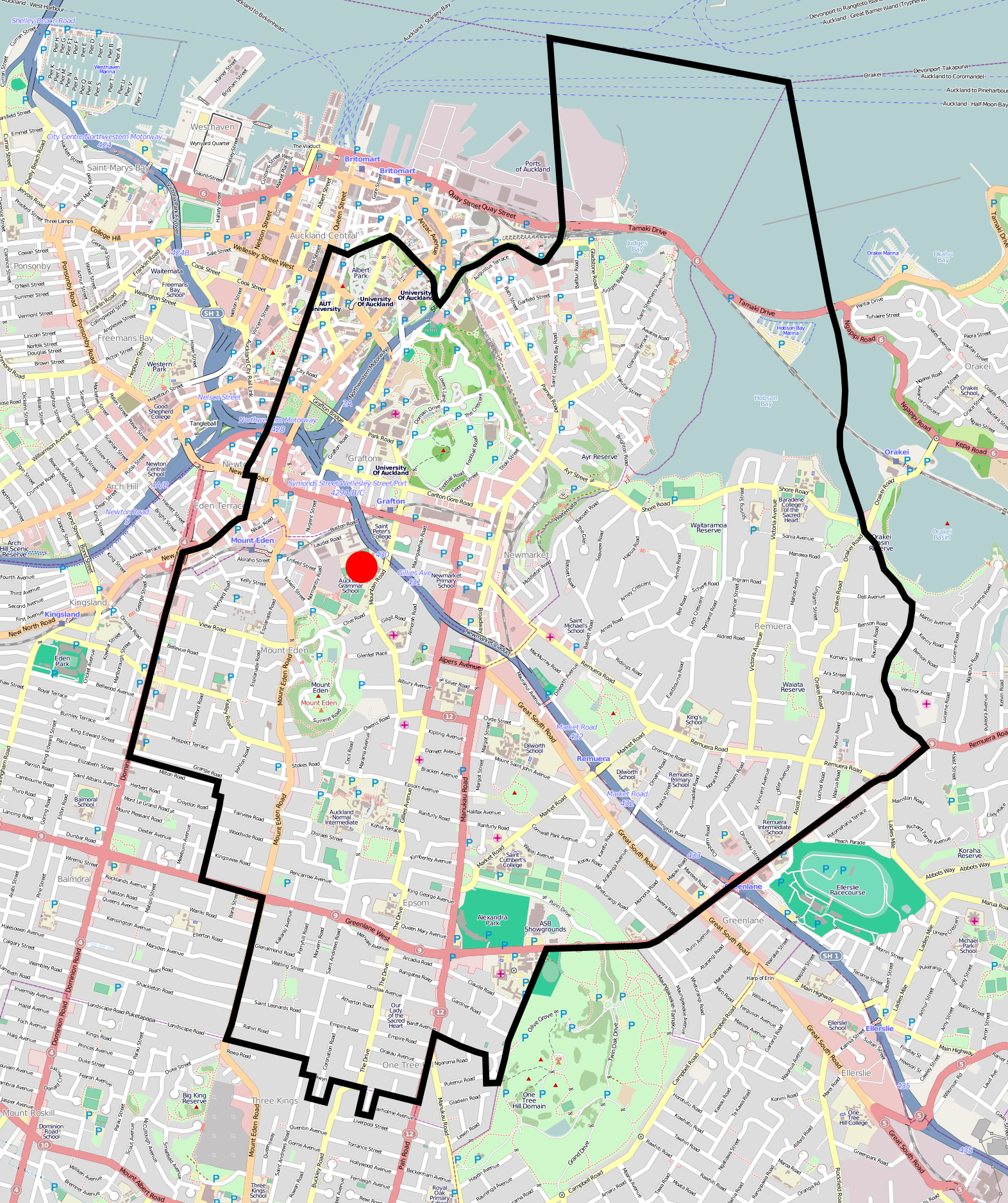
Auckland Grammar's enrolment home zone covers the eastern Auckland Central Business District (CBD) and inner suburbs south-east of the CBD. The school is marked by the red circle.

As of July 2026, Auckland Grammar School had a roll of 2,767 students, of which 176 (6.4%) identify as Māori.

As of 2026, the school has an Equity Index of 386, placing it amongst schools whose students have the fewest socioeconomic barriers to achievement (roughly equivalent to deciles 9 and 10 under the former socio-economic decile system).

Historically, entry was selective to the school. The school was zoned at least since the 1960s. Since 2000, school zoning is determined by a state school enrolment scheme, which gives first preference to students living in a designated home zone, and then to brothers of current students who live outside the zone. The school argues that zoning increases house prices in the zone, reducing access to the school for students from lower socio-economic groups. Research by the Real Estate Institute of New Zealand shows there is a 30 percent premium ($257,000) on houses in-zone compared to those out of zone. In 2014, nearby One Tree Hill College and Selwyn College introduced enrolment schemes which initially planned to overlap parts of the Auckland Grammar zone. Both were forced to backtrack after opposition from parents in the overlapping areas, who feared it could ultimately lead to Auckland Grammar shrinking its zone and affecting the resale value of their homes.

Auckland Grammar's requested voluntary donation is the highest for a non-integrated state school in New Zealand. In 2014, the requested donation reached $1,050 per student per year. The school claimed the donation is high to cover the gap in government funding between it, a decile 9Q school, and the lowest decile schools (i.e. decile 1A). As a comparison, Auckland Grammar's female counterpart, Epsom Girls' Grammar School, asks for a donation of $665, despite also being decile 9Q.

International students are tested for English language proficiency and some students may be required to complete an intensive course of English language before starting at Auckland Grammar School. The international students at Auckland Grammar School paid the highest tuition fees in New Zealand state schools at more than $20,000 each year.

== Education ==
As a state school, Auckland Grammar School is required to follow the New Zealand Curriculum (NZC).

=== Results ===
In 2024, 96.5 percent of students leaving Auckland Grammar held at least NCEA Level 1 or IGCSE, 92.3 percent held at least NCEA Level 2 or AS level, 80.7 percent held at least NCEA Level 3 or A level. For schools of a similar equity index, the attainment rates for boys were 96.2%, 92.9%, and 80.6% respectively.

In its regular survey of Auckland's schools, Metro in 2011 reported that Auckland Grammar's academic results are comparable with most private schools and that it scores very well in the National Scholarship exams. In its 2016 report, the Education Review Office reported that the school continued to achieve high-education outcomes for its students. It was ranked seventh in the Crimson-QS Best New Zealand schools in 2019 for entrance into top-ranked universities.

=== NCEA ===
The previous headmaster, John Morris, is a vocal critic of NCEA. In response to what is perceived by the school to be a poorly designed system being forced on them, the school introduced Cambridge International Examinations in 2002, offering the IGCSE, AS Level and A2 examinations to its more talented students. Other students sit NCEA exams. Students placed in an IGCSE/AS/A2 class are allowed to switch to NCEA, but this is usually discouraged by the school. However, in the ensuing years the majority of students were encouraged to take part in CIE qualifications. The introduction of New Zealand Scholarship has been viewed sceptically by the school, and it encourages only the top students to attempt it. Despite this, the school had the highest number of scholarships of any school in New Zealand in 2006. The 2008 Education Review Office (ERO) report commented the School ranks among the highest performing schools in New Zealand from the results in national and international examinations. From 2011, the school offered the CIE Form 5 programme to all students in Form 5. From 2019, the School replaced all external examinations (both Cambridge IGCSE and NCEA Level 1) for Fifth Formers with an in-house preparatory qualification, Pre-Q, set to be "more rigorous than IGCSE", in response to planned reforms to NCEA, abolishing external examinations at Level 1.

== School song ==
The school song was introduced in March 1955. The words were composed in 1954 by L. W. A. Crawley, senior Classics lecturer at Auckland University College (now the University of Auckland). The song consists of two verses in Latin and includes the school motto as a refrain. It is sung to the melody of the German hymn "Ein feste Burg ist unser Gott" ("A Mighty Fortress Is Our God").

== Administration ==
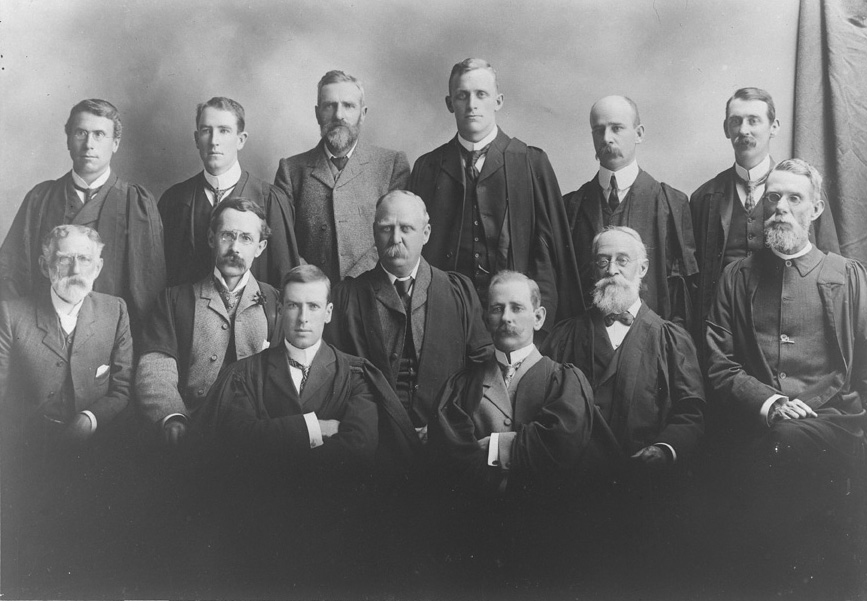
Staff of Auckland Grammar School in 1903

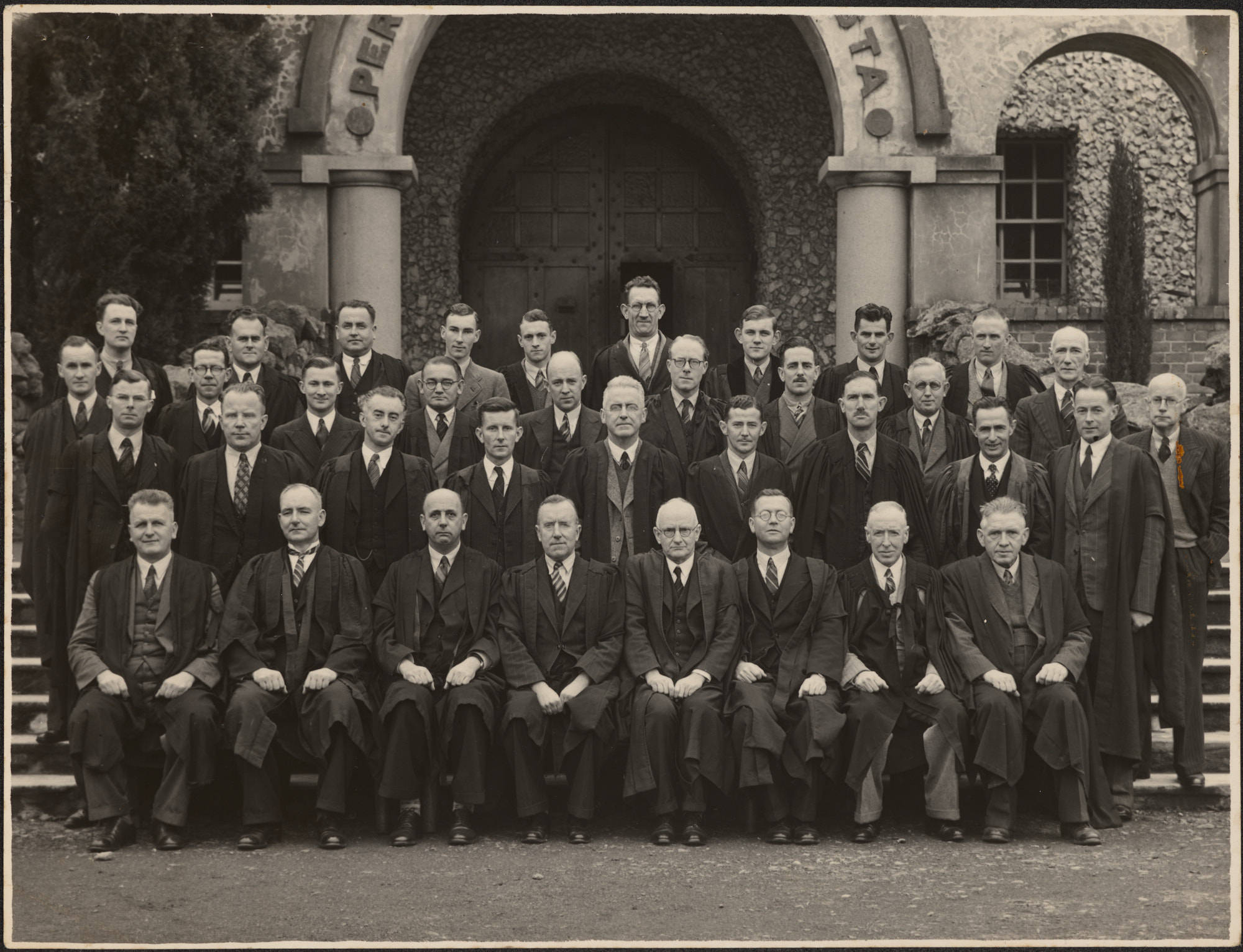
Staff of Auckland Grammar School in 1941

=== Headmasters ===
The following individuals have served as headmaster of Auckland Grammar School:

Period	Headmaster
1869–1870	Dr Robert Boyd Kidd
1871–1882	Farquhar Macrae
1882–1892	Charles Frederick Bourne
1893–1922	James William Tibbs CMG
1922–1928	James Drummond
1928–1935	Harold James Del Monte Mahon
1935–1954	Colin McGregor Littlejohn
1954–1972	Sir Henry Cooper CBE
1973–1993	Sir John Graham KNZM CBE ED
1994–2012	John Morris ONZM
2012–present	Tim O'Connor

=== Chairmen of the Board of Governors ===
The following individuals have served as chairman of the Board of Governors:

Period	Chairman of the Board of Governors
1869–1872	John Williamson, Esq.
1872–1879	Hon. Mr. Thomas Gillies
1879–1880	Sir John Logan Campbell, MD, FRCS
1880–1916	Hon. Sir George Maurice O'Rorke, MA, LL.D.
1916–1937	Prof. Sir Algernon Thomas, KCMG, MA (Oxon), FLS, FGS, FRSNZ
1937–1940	Dr. E. Robertson, MD
1940–1948	Hon. Justice Sir Joseph Stanton, LL.B.
1948–1951	Victor Macky, Esq., FPANZ
1951–1952	Hon. Sir Leslie Munro, KCMG, KCVO, MA, LL.M.
1952–1969	D. Sumner, Esq., JP
1969	Assoc. Prof. B.F. Harris, MA (Oxon), BA, B.Div, PhD
1970–1975	Maxwell Rae Grierson, OBE, Esq., LL.B.
1975–1984	N. Barclay Esq., FCA
1984–1985	R.V. Eades, Esq., LL.B.
1985	Prof. D.I.B. Smith, MA, PhD (Oxon)

=== Chairmen of the Board of Trustees ===
The following individuals have served as the Chairmen of the Auckland Grammar School Board of Trustees:

Period	Chairman of the Board of Trustees
1984–1992	B.F. Connell, LL.B.
1992–1997	Prof. Alastair MacCormick, CNZM, BS, MCom, MA, PhD
1998–2009	Dr. Robert B. Kirkpatrick, B.Eng., PhD, MIPENZ
2009–2019	A. Jeff Blackburn, BCom, LL.B.
2019–present	Mark Sandelin, BA, LL.B.

== Notable alumni ==
=== Academia ===
- Norman Lowther Edson – professor
- Denis Feeney – professor
- Raymond Firth – ethnologist
- Dave Gerrard – sports administrator, sports medicine specialist, and former Olympic Games swimming representative
- Keith Hunter – ocean chemist
- Vaughan Jones – mathematician
- Hugh Kāwharu – Māori scholar
- Richard Cockburn Maclaurin – mathematical physicist, president of the Massachusetts Institute of Technology
- Colin Maiden – mechanical engineer, university administrator and company director
- Joseph Peart – army officer and fourth Headmaster of King's College, Auckland
- John Reid – professor
- Terry Sturm – professor of English at the University of Auckland

=== The arts ===
- Walter Armiger Bowring – portrait and landscape painter, illustrator, cartoonist and caricaturist
- Russell Crowe – actor
- Gerald Garrick Cunningham – author, photographer, historian and businessman
- Les Gibbard – political cartoonist, journalist, illustrator and animator
- Max Gimblett – artist
- Charles Frederick Goldie – artist
- Tony Hung – Hong Kong actor
- Zane Lowe – DJ, record producer, and television presenter
- Horace Massey – architect
- James McNeish – novelist, playwright and biographer
- Andrew Niccol – screenwriter, producer, and director
- Gabriel Reid – writer, director, producer and educator
- Graeme Revell – musician and composer
- Campbell Thomas – theatre director and artist

=== Broadcasting ===
- John Hawkesby – news presenter

=== Business ===
- Uluomato'otua Aiono – entrepreneur
- John Buchanan – scientist and director
- Ron Carter – businessman
- Richard Chandler – billionaire investor
- Ernest Davis – businessman
- James Fletcher Jnr – industrialist
- Terry Jarvis – cricket player and sales representative
- Ian Narev – chief executive officer of SEEK, former managing director and chief executive officer of the Commonwealth Bank

=== Literature ===
- A. R. D. Fairburn – poet
- R. A. K. Mason – poet
- John Mulgan – writer, journalist and editor

=== Military ===
- Cyril Bassett – Victoria Cross recipient
- Ray Hanna – fighter pilot
- Leslie Potter – WW2 commander
- Douglas St George – chief of the Air Staff (1971–1974)

=== Public service ===
- Alfred E. Allen – politician
- David Baragwanath – lawyer and jurist
- Thomas Bavin – 24th premier of New South Wales
- Wayne Brown – politician and mayor of Auckland
- Edward Caradus – analytical chemist, educator and administrator
- Jonathan Coleman – politician
- Roger Douglas – politician and 35th minister of finance
- Paul Goldsmith – member of Parliament
- Israel Goldstine – politician, businessman, barrister and solicitor
- Doug Graham – politician
- Eric Halstead – politician
- Kenneth Hayr – senior Royal Air Force commander
- Jonathan Hunt – politician and 26th speaker of the House of Representatives
- Kenneth Keith – judge
- George Laking – diplomat
- Sam Lotu-Iiga – member of Parliament
- Douglas Maclean – farmer and member of Parliament
- Duncan McMullin – jurist
- Leslie Munro – lawyer, journalist, and politician
- Avery Ng – Hong Kong politician and social activist
- David Seymour – politician, member of Parliament and 21st deputy prime minister of New Zealand
- Gaurav Sharma – politician, member of Parliament
- Lockwood Smith – politician, diplomat and 28th speaker of the House of Representatives
- Graham Speight – High Court judge
- Bob Tizard – 6th deputy prime minister of New Zealand

=== Science ===
- Raoul Franklin – physicist
- Peter Gluckman – scientist
- Matthew Hunter – metallurgist and inventor of the Hunter process
- Graham Liggins – medical scientist

=== Sport ===
As of 2015, Auckland Grammar has produced the most All Blacks out of any New Zealand school; it has a total of over 50 former All Blacks.

- Nicky Allen – All Blacks player
- Ben Atiga – All Blacks player
- Ces Badeley – All Blacks player
- Vic Badeley – All Blacks player
- Mark Burgess – cricketer
- Hamish Carter – triathlete
- Jeff Crowe – cricketer
- Martin Crowe – cricketer
- John Drake – All Blacks player
- Lockie Ferguson – cricketer
- Grant Fox – All Blacks player
- Eliota Fuimaono-Sapolu – Samoan rugby union player
- Aaron Gate – racing cyclist
- Edmund Hillary – mountaineer, explorer, and philanthropist
- Doug Howlett – rugby union player
- Konrad Hurrell – rugby league player
- Akira Ioane – All Blacks player
- Rieko Ioane – All Blacks player
- Kyle Jamieson – cricketer
- Hamish Kerr – high jumper
- Colin Latimour – New Zealand footballer
- Matt Macdonald – rower
- Cameron Mather – Scottish rugby player
- John (Joe) Mills – All Blacks player
- Dion Nash – cricketer
- James Neesham – cricketer
- Matthew Ridge – television presenter, and former rugby union and rugby league player
- Tom Schnackenberg – sailor and yacht designer
- Omar Slaimankhel – rugby league player
- Benson Stanley – All Blacks player
- Jeremy Stanley – All Blacks player
- Winston Stanley – Manu Samoa rugby player
- Matt Timoko – Rugby league player
- Kel Tremain – All Blacks player
- Sam Webster – track cyclist
- Alan Whetton – All Blacks player
- Gary Whetton – All Blacks player
- Wilson Whineray – All Blacks player

== Notable staff ==
- Ian Billcliff, cricketer, master
- Henry Cooper, educator, 8th headmaster
- John Graham, former rugby union player, educator, 9th headmaster
- Duncan Grant, former rower, former mathematics teacher
- Graham Henry, former master and rugby coach of Auckland, Wales, British and Irish Lions and All Blacks
- John Henry Howell, educator
- John Morris, former footballer, educator, 10th headmaster
- Willie Rickards, former rugby union coach, former rugby union player, master
- Lindsay Tait, former professional basketball player, director of basketball, head coach of premier basketball
- James Tibbs, educator, 4th headmaster

== See also ==
- Grammar school § New Zealand

== Bibliography ==
- Nicholls ("Streak"), C. N. (1987). Fifty Years at Grammar or Tales out of School. Auckland: ESA Books.
- Trembath, K. A. (1969). Ad Augusta. Auckland: The Auckland Grammar School Old Boys' Association. OCLC 447653.
