= 26th Battalion (New Zealand) =

- Active: 1940–1945
- Disbanded: December 1945
- Country: New Zealand
- Branch: New Zealand Military Forces
- Type: Infantry (1940 to 1945)
- Size: ~780 personnel
- Part of: 6th Brigade, 2nd Division
- Engagements: Second World War Battle of Greece North African Campaign: Operation Crusader; First Battle of El Alamein; Italian Campaign: Battle of Monte Cassino

The 26th Battalion was an infantry battalion of the New Zealand Military Forces, which served during the Second World War as part of the New Zealand 2nd Division. Raised in May 1940, it fought in the Battle of Greece, the North African Campaign and the Italian Campaign. It finished the war in Trieste and was disbanded in December 1945.

== Formation ==
Following the outbreak of the Second World War, the New Zealand government authorised the formation of the 2nd New Zealand Expeditionary Force (2NZEF), for service at home and abroad. Following consultation with the British government, it was decided that the main New Zealand contribution to the war effort would be in the form of an infantry division, the 2nd New Zealand Division, which would require nine battalions of infantry. Consequently, several infantry battalions were formed from 1939 to 1940 with New Zealand volunteers and these would eventually be sent to the Middle East, the expected deployment area of the 2nd New Zealand Division.

The 26th Battalion was formed at Burnham Camp in Christchurch in May 1940, with volunteers drawn from the Southern Military District, which took in the entirety of the South Island. The battalion, under the overall command of Lieutenant Colonel James Page, was the third and last of three infantry battalions making up the 6th Infantry Brigade. (Note: The other two infantry battalions were the 24th and 25th.) The battalion was organised into four rifle companies, designated as A, B, C and D companies. The first three of these companies had personnel drawn from the Canterbury, Southland and Otago provinces respectively, while D Company was staffed with personnel from the Nelson, Tasman and West Coast provinces. There was also a headquarters company with specialised personnel, such as signals, as well as a battalion headquarters.

== Greece ==
After a period of training, the 26th Battalion, departed New Zealand on the P&O liner Orcades on 27 August 1940. It, along with the two other infantry battalions of 6th Brigade, was destined for the Middle East. After transferring to the Orion in Bombay, India, the battalion arrived at the main 2NZEF base in Egypt, Maadi Camp, near the town of Maadi, on 30 September. Here, it was occupied with intensive training for three months before it, along with the rest of 6th Brigade, shifted to Helwan Camp. Training continued, becoming more tactically sophisticated. In the meantime, the 2nd Echelon which, while in transit to the Middle East, had been diverted to England to temporarily strengthen that country's defences, arrived in Egypt to finally complete the 2nd New Zealand Division.

The British government anticipated an invasion of Greece by the Germans in 1941 and decided to send troops to support the Greeks, who were already engaged against the Italians in Albania. The 2nd New Zealand Division, now at its full complement, was one of a number of Allied units dispatched to Greece in Operation Lustre during early March. The 6th Infantry Brigade was tasked with the defence of the coastal portion of the Aliakmon Line in northern Greece, with the 26th Battalion, apart from one company, based at Mount Olympus as the divisional reserve. Later in March, it was replaced by 23rd Battalion and moved forward to rejoin 6th Brigade near Katerini, digging in between the 24th and 25th Battalions.

On 6 April, the Germans invaded Greece and their advance was so rapid that it quickly threatened to outflank the Aliakmon Line. The brigade had to abandon its positions and was withdrawn to Olympus Pass on 9 April. This marked the beginning of a gradual retreat down the country, during which a series of rearguard actions were fought by elements of the division. During this time, the 26th Battalion was temporarily attached to the Australian 19th Brigade, which was manning the lines to the west of Servia Pass, adjacent the New Zealand 4th Brigade. After the Germans flanked the Australian positions, the 26th Battalion helped cover the subsequent withdrawal of the 19th Brigade on 16 April.

The battalion, faced with transportation issues, had to dump much of its supplies and had to march south to rejoin 6th Brigade, which was acting as the rearguard for the 2nd New Zealand Division. On 19 April, elements of the battalion boarded a train for the Thermopylae sector to the south, the rest journeying by truck. Arriving on 21 April, after a protracted journey with several bombing attacks by Luftwaffe aircraft, the battalion dug in at Molos. The next day, orders for the division to evacuate Greece were received and the battalion was instructed to form the rearguard. Apart from air raids, the battalion did not come in contact with the Germans although the neighbouring 25th Battalion did at the Battle of Thermopylae a few days later. It duly reached the beaches near Monemvasia and was evacuated from Greece on 29 April along with the rest of 6th Brigade, the 4th and 5th Brigades having been taken off beaches to the east of Athens. While the latter brigades disembarked at Crete, the 6th Brigade continued to Egypt.

The campaign in Greece cost the battalion 76 casualties; 11 men were killed and 42 were wounded. Four more died of their wounds and 29 men (including 10 of the wounded) were taken prisoner of war. Most of the fatalities were as a result of bombing raids as the battalion withdrew down the country.

== North Africa ==
By late May 1941, and after a period of training and refitting at Helwan, the 26th Battalion was back up to full strength and moved to Ismailia, near the Suez Canal. Here, along with the rest of the 6th Brigade, the battalion manned the Canal Zone defences against a possible attack. While there, the battalion experienced several air raids. The brigade remained in the area until mid-August, at which time it was replaced by 5th Brigade, which had been brought back up to strength after a disastrous campaign in Crete, and returned to Helwan.

The battalion continued to train, carrying out exercises involving travelling desert formation, and it received new equipment, including radios, bren carriers and trucks. On 18 September, the battalion moved to the Baggush Box, where the 2nd New Zealand Division was being concentrated. Large scale exercises involving several battalions moving in desert formation and practicing attacks on enemy positions. All this work was in preparation for the 2nd New Zealand Division's role in the upcoming Operation Crusader, which was planned to lift the siege of Tobruk. The New Zealanders were to be one of the 8th Army's infantry divisions that were to surround and capture the main strong points along the front while the armoured divisions were to engage Generalleutnant (Note: The rank of generalleutnant is equivalent to that of major general in the United States Army.) Erwin Rommel's Afrika Korps and then link up with the Tobruk garrison.

=== Operation Crusader ===
The campaign commenced on 18 November 1941, with 26th Battalion having moved to the starting point near Sidi Barrani along with the rest of the division. Expected to cover a lot of terrain, and with the brigades possibly having to be deployed independently of each other, 6th Brigade made its own arrangements for supplies and medical support. It spent the first days of the advance as a reserve, moving forward behind 4th and 5th Brigades. The brigade entered the fray on 21 November, and moved to Bir el Hariga while the 4th Brigade targeted the Bardia–Tobruk highway and the 5th Brigade the area around Bardia and Sollum. However, the following day, the 6th Brigade was ordered to advance to Point 175, set up a perimeter and then make contact with the 5th South African Brigade, which was in some difficulty, at Sidi Rezegh. Leaving early in the morning of 23 November, the 25th and 26th Battalions led the advance. At daybreak, they stopped and bivouacked in a wadi. While looking for the headquarters of 25th Battalion, Page, traveling in a Bren carrier encountered a German tank and staff car and opened fire. It transpired that a headquarters element of the Afrika Korps were also resting in the wadi. This initiated a battle in which the battalion took 200 prisoners.

The 6th Brigade moved on quickly to take Point 175, which was held by German forces. Point 175 marked the start of the Sidi Rezegh escarpment, 40 kilometres (25 mi) from Tobruk. It was largely occupied by German forces with the 5th South African Brigade on a nearby escarpment. While 25th Battalion attacked Point 175, the 26th Battalion moved to link up with the South Africans, who were under artillery fire, and prepared rudimentary defences about 1.7 kilometres (1.1 mi) distant from them. On reaching the South African headquarters, Page was advised that a German tank attack was imminent. He returned to his own position and later in the afternoon watched the South African positions be overrun by the Germans, who then turned their attention to the nearby New Zealanders. The battalion came under attack and Page ordered its transport back to the rear, followed by the artillery that was under his command. The infantry held on until dusk and then retreated. The situation at Point 175 had deteriorated following its seizure by 25th Battalion earlier in the day and 26th Battalion was ordered in the early hours of 24 November to form a reserve position in a wadi to the east of Point 175. They were in position before daybreak. By this time the two Panzer divisions that had attacked Point 175 had moved off to the Egyptian border so the battalion had a quiet day. A platoon that had gotten lost during the retreat off Point 175 linked up with the battalion.

Casualties in 26th Battalion during Operation Crusader amounted to nearly 90 killed, over 130 wounded and 226 made prisoner of war.

=== Syria ===
A period of rebuilding followed the withdrawal of 26th Battalion to Baggush, and Lieutenant Colonel S. Satterthwaite was appointed to take command from the wounded Page on 8 December. It remained at Baggush until 23 January 1942, when it moved to Maadi. Shortly afterwards it was called into Cairo to increase the Allied presence there and counter potential unrest amongst the civilian population of the city. Once tensions decreased it returned to Maadi and resumed training, which included practice in amphibious operations. Over the period from late February to mid-March, the 2nd New Zealand Division moved into Syria. The Allied high command was concerned that the Middle East was at risk from an invasion by the Germans and the New Zealanders were part of the force tasked with blocking their likely route from the Caucasus. The battalion commenced its trip north on 12 March and after a few days arrived at Aleppo, where it manned a number of facilities. One company at a time was detached periodically to outposts on the frontier between Syria and Turkey. In mid-April, the battalion shifted south to Bekaa Valley, where it worked on defensive positions alongside the rest of 6th Brigade.

The later part of May and early June was spent on brigade exercises, training alongside armour and moving in desert formation both in day and at night. On 9 June the battalion was sent to Aleppo; it conducted further training in the desert while en route. Once in Aleppo, it was on guard duty at the 'German Barracks'. However, following the attack in June on the 8th Army's Gazala Line by Panzer Army Africa, the 2nd New Zealand Division was recalled to Egypt on 17 June. The 26th Battalion commenced its journey south by train the next evening. By this time the battalion was commanded by Lieutenant Colonel Jan Peart, his predecessor, Satterthwaite, having been repatriated to New Zealand in May. Peart was an experienced commander, as he had led No. 18 Battalion through Operation Crusader. The battalion arrived at Mersa Matruh late in the evening of 20 June, having traveled 900 miles (1,400 km) since it departed Syria just two days previously.

=== Egypt ===
It had been planned that the New Zealanders would be based at Matruh, but Freyberg, the divisional commander, was unhappy with this for he regarded the position as a trap. The 26th Battalion was the first unit of 6th Brigade to arrive; they were ordered to assemble at Amiriya and moved there on 24 June. The next day, after the fall of Tobruk to Rommel's forces, the division was tasked with establishing defensive positions at Minqar Qaim. It was to hold and delay the advance of the Panzer Army Africa for as long as it could while remaining intact.

The 26th Battalion, along with the rest of the 6th Brigade, were ordered to set up camp at El Alamein while the 4th and 5th Brigades went south to Minqar Qaim. The 6th Brigade, now commanded by Brigadier George Clifton, was initially held in reserve before being ordered to man the Kaponga Box at Bab el Qattara. Arriving on 28 June, the 26th Battalion guarded the southern side of the box, while the 24th and 25th Battalions were responsible for the northern and west sides respectively. The brigade remained here, watching first the retreating British stream by and then the Germans, at a distance, for several days before moving to Amiriya. It missed the action of 14–15 July at Ruweisat Ridge which saw the destruction of a large part of the 4th and 5th Brigades when, after securing the ridge, no armour was available to defend a counterattack by the Germans. The 6th Brigade was recalled to the El Alamein lines to relieve what was left of the 4th Brigade. A few days later, it was involved in a night-time attack on the El Mrier Depression. The aim was to secure the depression to create a route through which British armour could penetrate.

The attack commenced the night of 21 July, following an intensive artillery barrage. The 26th Battalion was on the right flank of the advance, with two companies on its front, with another two companies behind. A transport column with anti-tank guns, mortars, a machine gun platoon and ammunition carriers was to follow. Initial progress was straightforward until a minefield was encountered and the troops came under fire. After a short delay, the New Zealanders charged the ridge and into the El Mrier Depression. There they encountered German tanks and dug in while awaiting the battalion's support arms. Contact was lost with 24th Battalion on the left and meanwhile the transport column had run into the minefield. Sappers were working to clear the mines, but there were much more than expected.

The German presence in the basin began to increase with isolated pockets of New Zealanders being rounded up with the assistance of tanks. Prior to dawn, and with no news on the arrival of the expected British armour, Peart ordered a withdrawal of the battalion from the depression. On reaching the start line from where the battalion commenced its advance the previous night, Peart made contact with Brigadier Leslie Inglis, commanding the division after Freyberg's wounding at Minqar Qaim. He was ordered to return to the depression where the British armour were beginning to arrive. Peart took one of the rifle companies back to El Mrier and was able to secure a position overlooking it. While the British tanks, Valentines, were outgunned by the German armour, the accompanying anti-tank guns were much more effective. As a result, the German tanks were withdrawing. In the early afternoon of 22 July, Peart was ordered to withdraw and the battalion was subsequently taken out of the line. The 26th Battalion incurred over 160 casualties: 31 men were killed, 63 wounded, and 68 taken prisoner.

The 8th Army was now under the command of General Bernard Montgomery, who was planning for offensive operations against the Panzer Army Africa, which had formed a defensive position at Alamein. Minus its 4th Brigade, which had incurred significant losses at Ruweisat Ridge and had been withdrawn from the front so it could be converted to armour, the 2nd New Zealand Division was to play a major role in the forthcoming attack. In the first of its three phases, beginning on 23 October, the New Zealanders advanced behind a creeping artillery barrage which commenced at 9:40 pm. The 24th Battalion led off to secure the first line of defence, held by elements of the Italian Trento Division and personnel of the German 164th Light Division. Along with 25th Battalion, 26th Battalion took over the lead and quickly attained its objective for the day, Miteiriya Ridge. It then began consolidating its positions.

The New Zealanders were withdrawn from their positions four days later and remained out of the fighting while the Australian 9th Division took up the offensive in the northern sector of the front. Along with two British infantry brigades, the 2nd New Zealand Division resumed the fight on 2 November in Operation Supercharge, which was intended to break the frontlines in the south. The German defences collapsed and on 4 November they began retreating with the New Zealanders in pursuit. In mid-November, the division was withdrawn for rest and re-organisation.

=== Tunisia ===
In the meantime, the Panzer Army Africa had withdrawn to the Mareth Line in Tunisia and following a failed attack by the Germans on the 8th Army at Medenine in early March, the Allied response was for the New Zealanders, along with British and Free French forces, to drive forward to the Tebaga Gap, south of the Mareth Line. On 21 March, the 6th Brigade mounted a night-time attack on a feature known as Point 201, which was defended by Italian forces. The attack was on a two battalion frontage, with the 26th Battalion on the right and the 25th Battalion, tasked with the capture of Point 201 itself, on the left. Although the objective was achieved by midnight and with only five fatalities in the battalion, the breach that was achieved was not exploited by the supporting British armour. The New Zealanders had to then endure three days of artillery bombardments.

The next attempt to capture the Tebaga Gap was mounted on 27 March by the infantry of the 5th Brigade along with the 6th Brigade's 24th Battalion in a supporting role. The 26th Battalion was placed in reserve, with 28th Battalion taking over its positions. The attack was a total success and the next day the 2nd New Zealand Division moved forward to advance on Gabes. It was not required for the next phase of fighting, a successful attack on the Wadi Akarit Line by 30 Corps, and spent several days resting at Gabes. On 7 April, it moved forward to Enfidaville, to where the Axis forces had withdrawn, with the rest of 10 Corps. The outskirts of Enfidaville were reached on 15 April, but resistance prevented the rifle companies from entering the town that day. Preparations for a full-scale attack on nearby Takrouna commenced with the battalion tasked with attacking towards ridges to the east while 5th Brigade targeted Takrouna itself. The attack commenced at 11:00pm and after an hour, the objective was secured with few casualties although in the days following more were incurred as a result of shelling.

The fighting in Tunisia ceased with the formal surrender of the Afrika Korps on 12 May 1943, and the New Zealanders shortly afterwards began returning to Egypt. Within 26th Battalion, replacements were found for the three company commanders who were casualties of the last battle. On 1 June, they arrived back at Maadi Camp and were greeted with news of the implementation of furlough leave for long serving personnel. The first draft of 162 men, mostly experienced commissioned and non-commissioned officers and making up nearly a fifth of the battalion's full complement, left for New Zealand on 14 June. After a period of rest, training resumed in mid-July and this helped newly arrived reinforcements, bringing the battalion up to 780 personnel, integrate with the experienced soldiers. Training was now focused on combat conditions that were to likely to be encountered in Europe rather than the open fields of the desert. In mid-September, the battalion began preparations for a move to Italy, where the 2nd New Zealand Division would rejoin the Eighth Army.

== Italy ==
The 6th Brigade left Egypt on 5 October aboard three transports, arriving at the Italian port of Taranto three days later. It remained here for several weeks, acclimatising to the country and refining its tactical training, discarding much of what had been learned in desert warfare. It also received new equipment, including the Piat, an anti-tank weapon, and a sniper section was formed. By late October, the 2nd New Zealand Division was once again complete for the 4th Brigade, now converted to armour, had arrived in Italy. The move to the front lines commenced in November, the New Zealanders taking responsibility for a section along the banks of the Sangro River on 20 November. The 26th Battalion manned a 300-yard stretch of the front, adjacent to the 25th Battalion. On 27 November, after a period of poor weather, the brigade forded the river on foot with the 26th Battalion on the left flank, the 25th in the centre, and the 24th on the right. Although the battalion failed to all of its objectives, Fountaine was satisfied with his command's progress into the hills on the far side of the river, and they had taken 30 prisoners of war, mostly Polish and Russian conscripts from the 65th Infantry Division. The battalion subsequently settled into the village of Castelfrentano.

=== Orsogna ===
In the following weeks, the battalion was involved in the 6th Brigade's attack on Orsogna, as part of the Moro River Campaign. An initial assault on 3 December carried out by the 25th Battalion with tank support failed. Further attempts to take Orsogna were made by various units of the 2nd New Zealand Division over the following days. The 26th Battalion took part in one such action on 24 December; along with two battalions from the 5th Brigade, it attacked up Fontegrande Ridge with the objective of outflanking Orsogna. This also failed. The 6th Brigade was withdrawn for a rest a week later, and the remainder of the division followed shortly thereafter once its positions around Orsogna were relieved.

=== Cassino ===
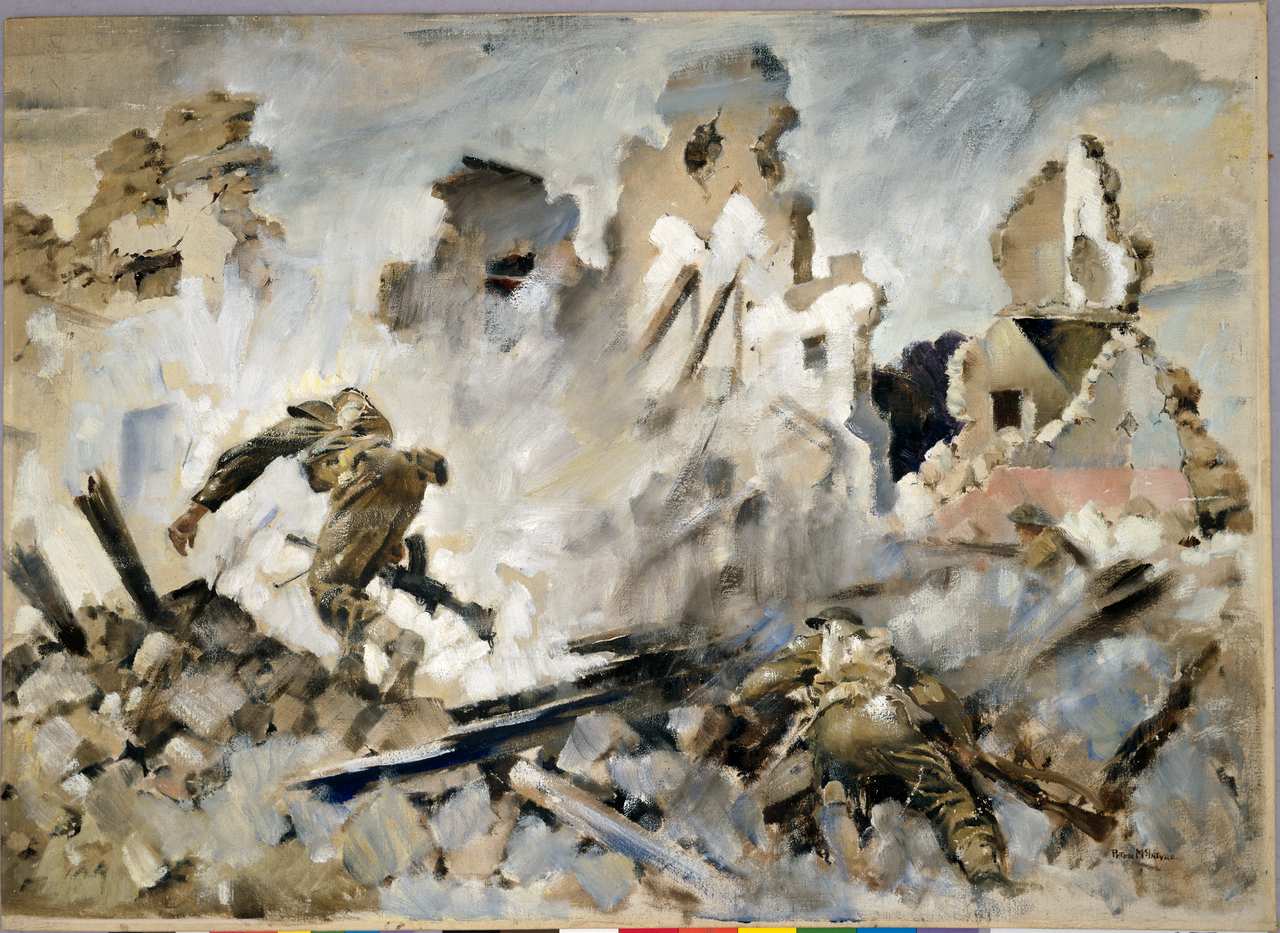
A depiction of the fighting at Cassino by the official war artist of the 2NZEF, Peter McIntyre

Following its withdrawal from the Orsogna area, the 2nd New Zealand Division was one of a number of divisions that were transferred from the British Eighth Army to the U.S. Fifth Army, then engaged on the western side of the Apennines. This was part of an overall strategy to breach the Gustav Line and break an otherwise deadlocked Italian front. Together with the 4th Indian Division and supporting British and American artillery, the division became part of the newly formed New Zealand Corps, under the command of the New Zealand divisional commander, Lieutenant-General Sir Bernard Freyberg. The corps moved to Cassino, the defenders of which had resisted American forces for several weeks.

An initial attack on Cassino, which involved the 4th Indian Division, the 28th Maori Battalion and New Zealand engineers, was mounted on 15 February but failed due to a lack of air and armoured support. The 6th Brigade was allocated for another attempt on Cassino, attacking from the north to seize the town and then secure a major road, Route 6, and railway station. The Indian 4th Division would then attack the overlooking monastery.

The 6th Brigade moved to its starting position on 21 February, relieving American troops in the area. A prolonged period of rain delayed the start of the attack, for which the 26th Battalion was to be the initial reserve. It commenced on 15 March, with the bombing of Cassino, after which the New Zealanders, led by 25th Battalion and two squadrons of tanks of 19th Armoured Regiment, were to advance into the town. By the late afternoon, that reinforcements were required and 26th Battalion was committed to the fighting. The rifle companies moved forward about the outskirts of the town to reach Route 6, but in the dark it took three hours to advance 1,600 metres (1,700 yd) to their objective and they set up shelter in and around the town's Municipal Buildings. The defenders, German paratroopers, had many of their positions intermingled with the New Zealanders, and throughout the night sniped at the men of 25th and 26th Battalion and engaged in small, sharp combats.

The 6th Brigade was withdrawn on 1 April and it was left to II Polish Corps to capture Cassino in mid-May.

=== Advance to Florence ===
The 2nd New Zealand Division was held in reserve until 9 July, having spent the intervening period recuperating in Avezzano, and assigned to XIII Corps.

Later in October, the New Zealanders were relieved and sent to Fabriano for rest and recuperation. During this time, the division was reorganised, with each of the infantry brigades expanding from three to four battalions. It reentered the frontlines, near the town of Faenza, in late November, under V Corps. The following month, the battalion crossed the Lamone River and joined the other infantry battalions of the 6th Brigade in attacks in and around Faenza. Along with the rest of the 2nd New Zealand Division, it then wintered along the Senio River, remaining there until March 1945.

The battalion finished the war in Trieste and remained there for several weeks, until the large numbers of Yugoslav partisans also present in the city withdrew. Not required for service in the Pacific theatre of operations, the battalion was disestablished in late 1945. During the war, 26th Battalion lost nearly 430 officers and men, either killed in action or died of wounds. Just over 400 personnel were made prisoners of war, half during the fighting in Libya in late 1941.

== Honours ==
Six members of the battalion, including five of its commanders, (Note: Page, Peart, Fountaine, Richards and Fairbrother.) were awarded the Distinguished Service Order while a member of the YMCA who was attached to the battalion for a portion of its service overseas was appointed a Member of the Order of the British Empire along with three other personnel. Eleven officers were awarded the Military Cross with one of them also awarded a bar. Five non-commissioned officers received the Distinguished Conduct Medal and 36 personnel the Military Medal. One man received the United States Bronze Star and numerous personnel, including the original commander of the battalion, were mentioned in dispatches.

The 26th Battalion was awarded the following battle honours:

Mount Olympus, Servia Pass, Olympus Pass, Molos, Greece 1941, Crete, Maleme, Galatas, 42nd Street, Withdrawal to Sphakia, Middle East 1941–44, Tobruk 1941, Sidi Rezegh 1941, Sidi Azeiz, Belhamed, Alam Hamza, Mersa Matruh, Minqar Qaim, Defence of Alamein Line, Ruweisat Ridge, El Mreir, Alam el Halfa, El Alamein, El Agheila, Nofilia, Medinine, Tebaga Gap, Point 201 (Roman Wall), El Hamma, Enfidaville, Takrouna, Dejbel Terhouna, Djebel es Stafi, Djebibina, North Africa 1940–43, The Sangro, Castel Frentano, Orsogna, Cassino I, Cassino Railway Station, Arezzo, Advance to Florence, Cerbala, San Michele, Paula Line, Celle, Faenza Pocket, Rio Fontanaccia, St. Angelo in Salute, Pisciatello, The Senio, Santerno Crossing, Bologna, Sillaro Crossing, Idice Bridgehead, Italy 1943–45. (Note: The battle honours awarded for its work as an infantry battalion were entrusted to the Canterbury Regiment, The Otago and Southland Regiment, and The Nelson, Marlborough and West Coast Regiment.)

== Commanding officers ==
The following served as commanding officers of 26th Battalion:

- Lieutenant Colonel J. Page (May 1940 – November 1941)
- Lieutenant Colonel S. M. Satterthwaite (December 1941 – April 1942)
- Lieutenant Colonel J. N. Peart (May–September 1942)
- Major C. N. Watson (June 1942)
- Lieutenant Colonel D. J. Fountaine (September 1942 – December 1943; June–October 1944)
- Lieutenant Colonel E. E. Richards (December 1943 – April 1944)
- Lieutenant Colonel G. P. Sanders (June 1944)
- Lieutenant Colonel M. C. Fairbrother (October 1944 – September 1945)
- Major L. Pearce (September–December 1945)
