= John Morris (New Zealand footballer) =

New Zealand footballer

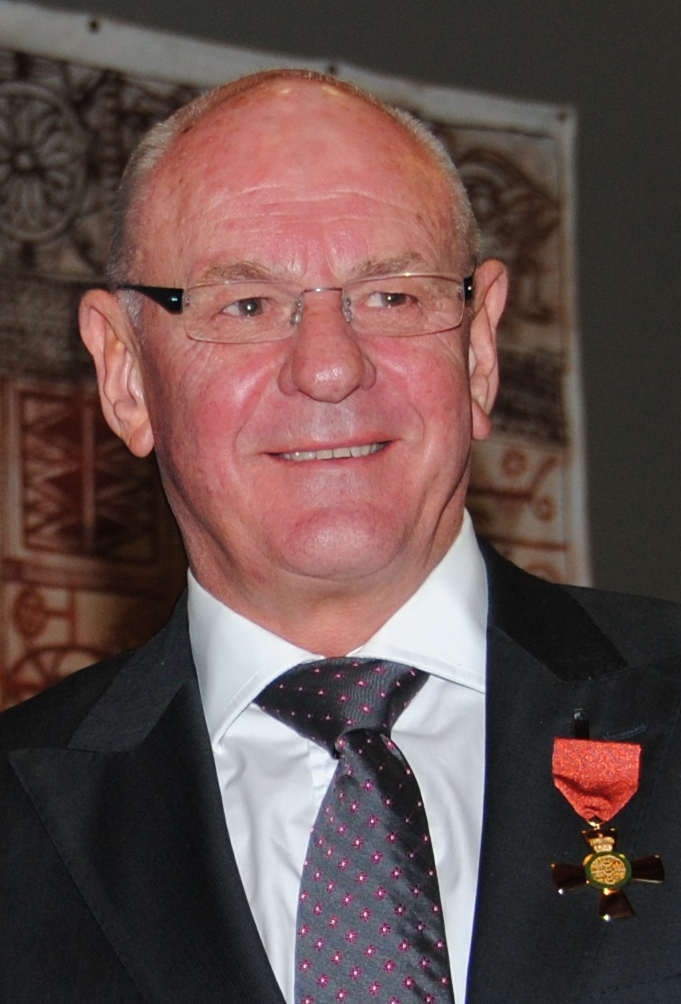
- Morris in 2013

Personal information
- Full name: John Morris
- Date of birth: 5 March 1950 (age 76)
- Place of birth: Bolton, Lancashire, England
- Position: Goalkeeper

Senior career*
Years	Team	Apps	(Gls)
- Blockhouse Bay

International career
1971–1973	New Zealand	8	(0)
Medal record
Men's association football
Representing New Zealand
OFC Nations Cup
Winner	1973 New Zealand
- * Club domestic league appearances and goals

John Morris ONZM (born 5 March 1950) is an educator and former association football goalkeeper who represented New Zealand at international level. He served as the headmaster of Auckland Grammar School for 19 years before his retirement in 2012.

== Football career ==
Morris made his full All Whites debut in a 2-4 loss to New Caledonia on 18 July 1971 and ended his international playing career with eight A-international caps to his credit, his final cap being an appearance in a 0-1 loss to Indonesia on 18 March 1973.

Morris also represented New Zealand in soccer administration and was Chairman of New Zealand Soccer between 2002 and 2008. He was also a long-serving member of the FIFA Technical and Development Committee.

In 2013, Morris became chair of the independent group Friends of Football

== Academic career ==
Morris graduated with a MA(Hons) in History from The University of Auckland in 1972. He gained a Diploma from Auckland College of Education in 1973.

Morris was appointed Headmaster of Auckland Grammar School in July 1993 after previously being Principal of Takapuna Grammar School for nearly four years. He is founding Chairman of the Association of Cambridge Schools in New Zealand and was a member of the University of Auckland Council for seven years.

Morris officially announced his retirement on 6 December 2011, taking effect in September 2012.

In 1999, he was awarded a Woolf Fisher Fellowship for Outstanding Educational Leadership.

In the 2013 New Year Honours, Morris was appointed an Officer of the New Zealand Order of Merit for services to education.

In 2019, Morris was appointed Executive Principal of Crimson Education.

== Honours ==
New Zealand

- OFC Nations Cup: 1973
