= Joseph Peart =

Lieutenant Colonel Joseph Norris Peart DSO
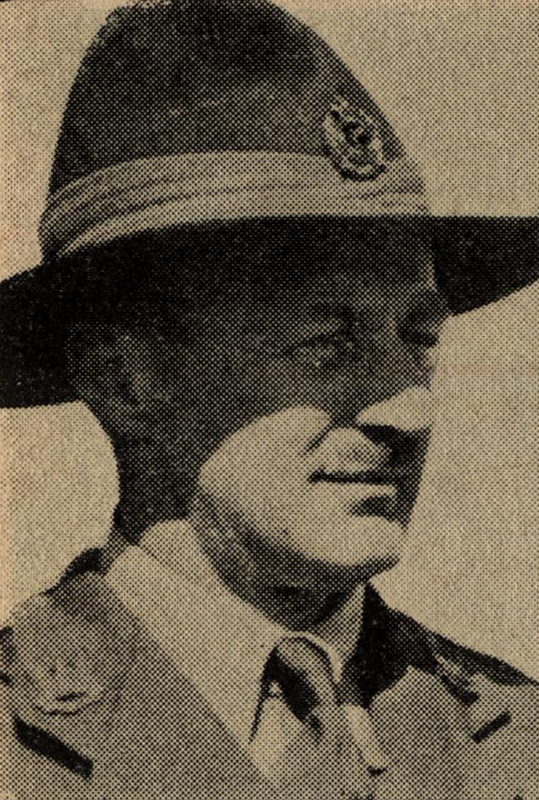
- Born: 12 February 1900; Collingwood, New Zealand
- Died: 4 September 1942 (aged 42) El Alamein, Egypt
- Allegiance: New Zealand
- Branch: New Zealand Military Forces
- Service years: 1939–1942
- Rank: Lieutenant Colonel
- Service number: 2571
- Commands: 18th Battalion; 26th Battalion
- Conflicts: World War II; North African campaign; Western Desert campaign; Battle of Alam el Halfa †
- Awards: Distinguished Service Order; 1939–1945 Star; Africa Star; War Medal 1939–1945; New Zealand War Service Medal

Lieutenant Colonel Joseph Norris Peart DSO (12 February 1900 – 4 September 1942) was an officer in the New Zealand Military Forces and the fourth headmaster of King's College. He volunteered for the New Zealand Expeditionary Force at the start of World War II and was killed at El Alamein during the Battle of Alam el Halfa at the age of 42.

== Early life ==
Peart was born at Collingwood in New Zealand on 12 February 1900 to Alfred and Salina Peart. He was an alumnus of Auckland Grammar School, and a graduate of Cambridge University. After graduation, Peart pursued a career in education.

== Headmastership ==
In 1937, Peart was appointed as the fourth headmaster of King's College, an independent secondary school in Middlemore. During his tenure as headmaster, Peart was remembered by his students as being youthful and as being a disciplinarian.

== Military service ==
Shortly after the outbreak of World War II in 1939, Peart enlisted in the New Zealand Expeditionary Force and was granted a commission as a major. His first posting was as the Deputy Assistant Adjutant General of the 2nd New Zealand Division in Greece and Crete. From November 1941 to March 1942, Peart was the commanding officer (CO) of the 18th Battalion. Later, from 1 May 1942, he was the CO of the 26th Battalion. Peart was awarded the Distinguished Service Order; the award was gazetted on 24 September 1942, i.e. three weeks after his death. The citation for this award read:

"For outstanding leadership, bravery and determination. At El Mreir Depression on the night 21/22 July, 1942 Lieutenant Colonel Peart led his Battalion in the 6 (NZ) Infantry Brigade attack on El Mreir Depression ... During all the fighting Lieutenant Colonel Peart was constantly moving about among his men encouraging them and at all times setting a high example of courage and perseverance. It is due to his outstanding leadership, determination and sound judgement that the Battalion remains a fighting unit."

Peart was killed on 4 September 1942 at El Alamein during the Battle of Alam el Halfa. He is buried at the El Alamein War Cemetery in Egypt.

== Legacy ==
- Joseph Peart is the eponym of Peart House, King's College.

== See also ==
- Western Desert campaign
