= Norman Lowther Edson =

New Zealand professor of biochemistry

Norman L Edson
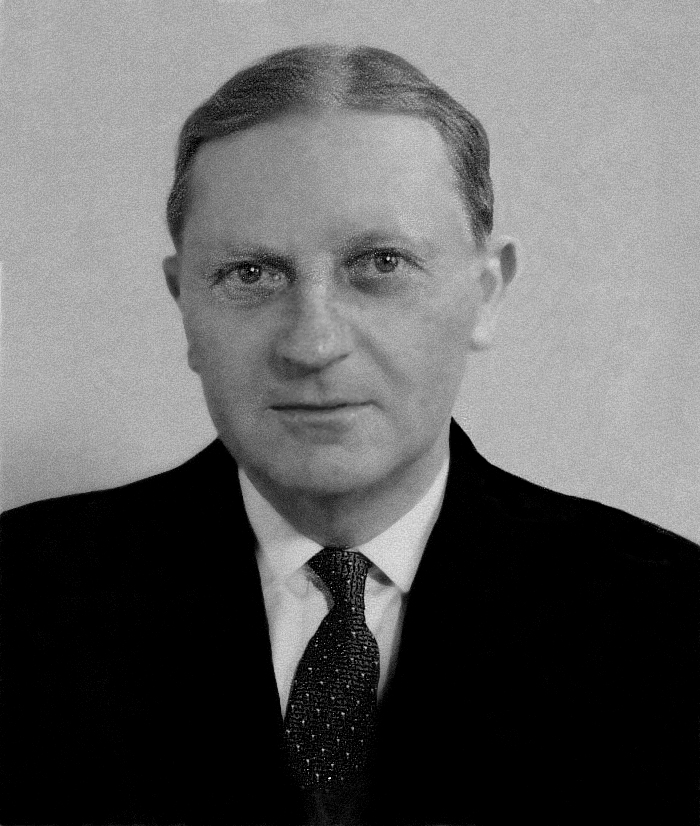
- Born: 1 March 1904
- Died: 12 May 1970 (aged 66)
- Education: University of New Zealand
- Known for: Ketone body metabolism, Metabolic pathways of mycobacteria, Polyol metabolism
- Spouse: Suzanne Moor
- Awards: Beit Memorial Fellowship 1933 Fellow of the Royal Society of New Zealand
- Scientific career
- Fields: Biochemistry
- Workplaces: University of New Zealand Faculty of Medicine, University of Cambridge, England
- Thesis: Studies in Intermediary Metabolism (1936)
- Doctoral advisor: Joseph Needham, Hans Krebs
- Notable students: Richard Kulka, John Exton

Norman Lowther Edson (1 March 1904 – 12 May 1970), FRSNZ, FNZIC, was the first Professor of Biochemistry (1949–1967) in the University of New Zealand based at the University of Otago, Dunedin, New Zealand where he founded a department of biochemistry. Edson made contributions to the understanding of ketone body metabolism in mammals and birds, metabolic pathways of Mycobacteria, and specificity rules for polyol dehydrogenases.

Edson made contributions to knowledge of cellular intermediary metabolism; developed a system of education in the elements of biochemistry for students of medicine, dentistry, and home science; a programme for a training in biochemistry leading to BSc/MSc; supervised postgraduate students in biochemistry to PhD; and was the medical member of the enquiry on the fluoridation of the New Zealand public water supply.

== Early life ==
Edson was the only surviving child of Norman Percival Edson (1868–1908), a pharmacist, and Phoebe, née Moses, a photographic colourist. Following her husband's early death, Phoebe Edson did not remarry but devoted herself to caring for her only child. Family money provided a comfortable home.

At Auckland Grammar School Edson won a Junior National Scholarship (1921) and was in the top ten Scholars for New Zealand. He entered the University of Otago School of Medicine in 1922, and his mother moved to Dunedin to housekeep for him. In 1927 he graduated Bachelor of Medical Science (BMedSc), the first to do so. Edson had a distinguished undergraduate career gaining four prizes and graduated in 1930 MB ChB with distinction. Edson excelled at hockey and represented his school, university, province and New Zealand.

== Marriage and family ==
Edson married Suzanne Moor (1917–2009), a medical student, in 1938. Edson was 34, Suzanne 21. They had three children.

== Postgraduate education ==
After graduating Edson spent two years jointly in the Departments of Chemistry and of Physiology at Otago University and received a Certificate of Proficiency in Chemistry in 1932 with a thesis on catalysis of oxybenzoic acids. Also as Assistant Lecturer in Physiology he gave practical classes and lectured on biochemistry. By then he had decided biochemistry was his subject. From this period Edson published two papers.

In 1933 Edson won a Beit Memorial Medical Fellowship and spent two years at Cambridge University at the Sir William Dunn Institute of Biochemistry whose director was Frederick Gowland Hopkins. Edson became Hans Adolf Krebs's first PhD student. Edson spent from the Easter term of 1934 to the Easter term of 1936 in Cambridge (Emmanuel College), two instead of the usual three years of the PhD, and the term of the Fellowship. His mother's ill health required an early return to New Zealand. His thesis, Studies in Intermediary Metabolism, gained him his PhD in December 1936.

In Cambridge, under Krebs' mentorship Edson conducted an extensive investigation on the metabolism of ketone bodies, substances produced in excess by humans during starvation or undiagnosed diabetes. Some of these studies (Edson and Leloir, 1936) were a link in a chain of experiments leading to Krebs' 1937 proposal of the citric acid cycle. During the same period Edson identified the product of purine ring formation in pigeon liver as hypoxanthine, which was converted to uric acid in the liver (Edson, Krebs and model, 1936; Edson, 1946). A derivative of hypoxanthine was subsequently shown by others to be the key product of purine biosynthesis. Krebs became Edson's lifelong friend, a long-range source of scientific advice, a host for his future postgraduate students and his own sabbatical in 1956 (see Krebs, 1981). Edson also befriended Luis Federico Leloir to whom he dedicated his 1966 paper on glucogenesis from sorbitol to celebrate Leloir's 60th birthday.

Krebs, in his reminiscences, refers to Edson twice: "With Norman Edson, a medical graduate and PhD student from New Zealand, I studied the formation of ketone bodies in liver slices." And in the index to people in the book, "Edson, Norman Lowther (1904–1970). New Zealand biochemist, Otago. My collaborator in Cambridge."

Edson also befriended Luis Federico Leloir and collaborated with him on ketogenesis. Edson dedicated his 1966 paper on glucogenesis from sorbitol to LeLoir to celebrate Leloir's 60th birthday. Edson also became acquainted with Ernst Chain and D D Wood.

In 1935 Edson attended the 15th International Congress of Physiology at Moscow. He subsequently told of hearing Ivan Pavlov speak and the destitution in the Moscow streets with the hungry placing their noses against the window looking at the plenty on the tables on the other side.

From Edson's Cambridge work came seven papers, all published in the Biochemical Journal. Two papers were co-authored with Krebs, on the micro-determination of uric acid and on the avian synthesis of uric acid; one with LeLoir on ketone metabolism. The four where he was the sole author were on ketogenesis.

== Academic life in New Zealand ==
Upon his return from Cambridge Edson was appointed Lectuter in Biochemistry at the University of Otago Medical School. He set up a modern biochemistry department for teaching and research. Initially he provided his own equipment and chemicals but later was supported by the Travis Trust for Tuberculosis Research. Fortunately in 1943 John Eccles, a noted neurophysiologist, was appointed to the chair of physiology. Eccles recognised Edson's talents and gave him full support in his enterprises (Eccles, 1977). Gradually Edson recruited a small staff and a number of research students who assisted in his teaching and research.

His early work in New Zealand was devoted to the delineation of metabolic pathways of Mycobacteria, relatives of the tuberculosis bacterium. He used the innovative approach of studying cell extracts which gave a clearer picture of bacterial metabolic pathways than whole cells, then currently in use (Edson, 1951).

In the 1950s, he and his students turned their attention to the metabolism of the polyols (sugar alcohols). They carried out an extensive survey of the diversity of the polyol dehydrogenases and determined rules for the steric specificity of these enzymes. (McCorkindale and Edson, 1954; Arcus and Edson, 1956).
