= 18th Battalion (New Zealand) =

WW2 New Zealand Army unit

18th Battalion (18th Armoured Regiment)
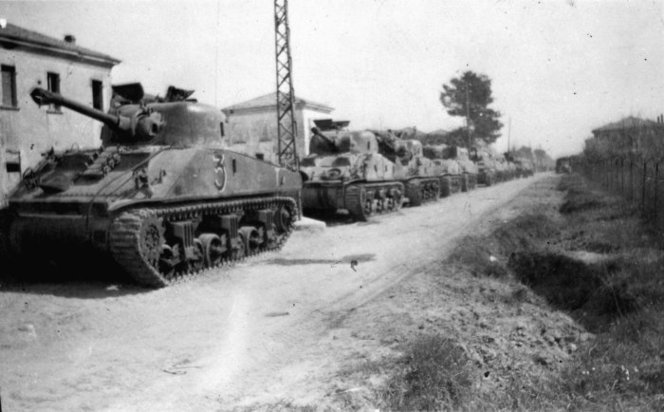
- Tanks of 18th Armoured Regiment waiting to move up for the crossing at Senio, Italy
- Active: 1939–45
- Disbanded: December 1945
- Country: New Zealand
- Branch: New Zealand Military Forces
- Type: Infantry (1939–42); Armoured (1943–45)
- Size: ~760 personnel
- Part of: 4th Infantry Brigade (1939–42); 4th Armoured Brigade (1943–45)
- Engagements: Second World War Battle of Greece Battle of Crete North African Campaign: Operation Crusader; First Battle of El Alamein; Italian Campaign: Battle of Monte Cassino

The 18th Battalion was a formation of the New Zealand Military Forces which served, initially as an infantry battalion and then as an armoured regiment, during the Second World War as part of the 2nd New Zealand Division.

The 18th Battalion was formed in New Zealand in September 1939. After a period of training, in 1940 it embarked for the Middle East as part of the 2nd New Zealand Division and then, in 1941, on to Greece. It participated in the Battle of Greece and later in the fighting on Crete. Evacuated from Crete, it then fought in the North African Campaign and suffered heavy losses during Operation Crusader. Brought back up to strength, in June 1942 the battalion participated in the breakout of the 2nd New Zealand Division from Minqar Qaim where it had been encircled by the German 21st Panzer Division. The following month, the battalion fought in the First Battle of El Alamein.

In October 1943, the battalion was converted to armour and re-designated the 18th Armoured Regiment. To replace men lost at El Alamein, personnel were drawn from a tank brigade being formed in New Zealand. The regiment spent a year in Egypt training with Sherman tanks, before embarking for Italy in October 1943 to join up with the rest of the 2nd New Zealand Division. It participated in the Italian Campaign, fighting in actions at Orsogna and later at Cassino. The regiment finished the war in Trieste and remained there for several weeks until the large numbers of Yugoslav partisans also present in the city withdrew. Not required for service in the Pacific theatre of operations, the regiment was disbanded in late 1945.

== Formation and training ==
Following the outbreak of the Second World War, the New Zealand government authorised the formation of the 2nd New Zealand Expeditionary Force (2NZEF), for service at home and abroad. After consulting with the British government, it was decided that the main New Zealand contribution to the war effort would be in the form of an infantry division, the 2nd New Zealand Division, under the command of Major General Bernard Freyberg. The new division would require nine battalions of infantry and consequently, several infantry battalions were formed from 1939 to 1940 with New Zealand volunteers.

The 18th Battalion (Note: The numbering of the battalions raised for the 2NZEF followed that of the existing 17 infantry battalions of the Territorial Force. Thus, the 18th Battalion was the first battalion formed for the 2NZEF.) was formed in September 1939 under the command of Lieutenant Colonel John Gray. It was the first of three infantry battalions designated to make up the first echelon of the 2nd New Zealand Division, destined for overseas service. (Note: The other two infantry battalions were the 19th and 20th.) Its personnel, all volunteers, were drawn from the Northern Military District, which took in the upper half of the North Island of New Zealand. They were formed into four rifle companies, designated A to D and corresponding to the Auckland, Hauraki/Bay of Plenty/Rotorua, Northland and Waikato districts. A headquarters company included the specialist support troops; signallers, anti-aircraft and mortar platoons, pioneers and transport as well as administrative personnel.

A period of rudimentary training followed, firstly at Hopuhopu Military Camp and then at Papakura, before it was confirmed that the battalion was on active service. It departed New Zealand on the Orient liner RMS Orion for the Middle East on 5 January 1940 as part of the 4th Infantry Brigade, 2nd New Zealand Division. Before it left, it paraded before the public at the Auckland Domain and was addressed by the commander of the Northern Military District, Lieutenant Colonel Norman Weir.

The Orion journeyed to its destination as part of a convoy of liners by way of Fremantle, Colombo, and Aden before it arrived at Tewfik, Egypt, where the battalion disembarked on 13 February 1940. After a train ride to Cairo, the battalion arrived at what would the main base in the Middle East for the 2NZEF, Maadi Camp, in mid-February. At Maadi, the battalion undertook further training. Following Italy's entry into the war in June, it moved to a newly established defensive position, the Baggush Box, to perform garrison duty. It remained there for the next several months, conducting regular patrols and working on the improvement of the defensive positions. During this time, the battalion suffered its first casualties of the war, although non-fatal, as a result of Italian air raids. By January 1941, the defensive work was completed and the battalion moved to Helwan Camp, near Cairo, for re-equipping and more intensive and large scale training.

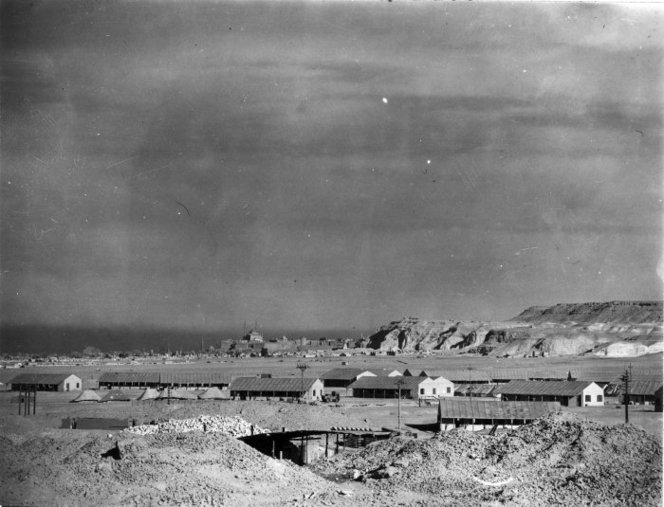
For a period in 1940, the 18th Battalion was based at Maadi military camp, seen here in 1941 with Cairo in the background

== Greece ==
In early 1941, the British Government anticipated an invasion of Greece by the Germans and decided to send troops to support the Greeks, who were already engaged against the Italians in Albania. The 2nd New Zealand Division was one of a number of Allied units dispatched to Greece in early March. The 18th Battalion was the first New Zealand unit to depart Egypt, and sailed for Greece on 7 March aboard the Royal Navy cruisers HMS Orion and Ajax. The 2nd New Zealand Division was tasked with the defence of the Aliakmon Line in northern Greece and was positioned on the northern side of Mount Olympus; the 4th Brigade manned the left side of the New Zealand section of the line while the 6th Brigade took the right. The 18th Battalion was the first complete unit in the line; one company was positioned in Olympus Pass itself while the remainder started digging in the sector allocated to 4th Brigade. By 5 April, the battalion's defensive work was completed.

On 6 April, the Germans invaded Greece and advanced so rapidly that their forces quickly threatened to outflank the New Zealand positions. On 9 April the 4th Infantry Brigade was withdrawn and began moving south to the Servia Pass. Here, the 18th Battalion was positioned in the hills above the town of Servia and to the right of 19th Battalion, which was defending the pass itself. From 11 April, Stukas mounted air raids on the New Zealand positions before the Germans brought artillery to bear two days later as their ground forces approached. It was during an artillery barrage on 15 April that the battalion suffered its first fatality of the war. The same day, the 18th Battalion fended off initial probing attacks by elements of the 9th Panzer Division but were unable to prevent the Germans from occupying Servia.

Despite this, the battalions of 4th Brigade remained in good defensive positions. However, they were withdrawn two days later to the Thermopylae Line, a new defensive position 140 kilometres (87 mi) to the south, due to pressure on their flanks. The withdrawal did not go smoothly for the New Zealanders who had to walk out on foot under the cover of darkness amidst harassing artillery fire. Having the furthest to travel, at one stage two companies of 18th Battalion got lost before making their way to the safety of the rear of Servia Pass and their transport. Once clear of the pass, the battalion's transport was subjected to several air raids before they finally made it to the Thermopylae Line, the next defensive position for the New Zealanders.

The Thermopylae Line was defended by the 2nd New Zealand Division and 6th Australian Division, with the 4th Brigade held in reserve while the 5th and 6th manned the front lines. However, on 22 April, the Allies decided to abandon Greece and the battalion moved out the same day with the rest of the 4th Brigade as part of an intended rearguard. Originally the battalion was to hold a gorge through which other units would pass for 24 hours but it ended up remaining there for three days. During the intervening period, the intended embarkation route for the battalion's departure from Greece was cut off by the Germans and so the entire brigade made its way to Porto Rafti, east of Athens, where the battalion was one of the first units of the 2nd New Zealand Division to be shipped to the island of Crete. Total casualties during the campaign in Greece were 23 killed in action and 42 wounded. In addition, 117 men, mostly personnel recuperating in hospitals in Athens and unable to evade the Germans, were captured.

== Crete ==
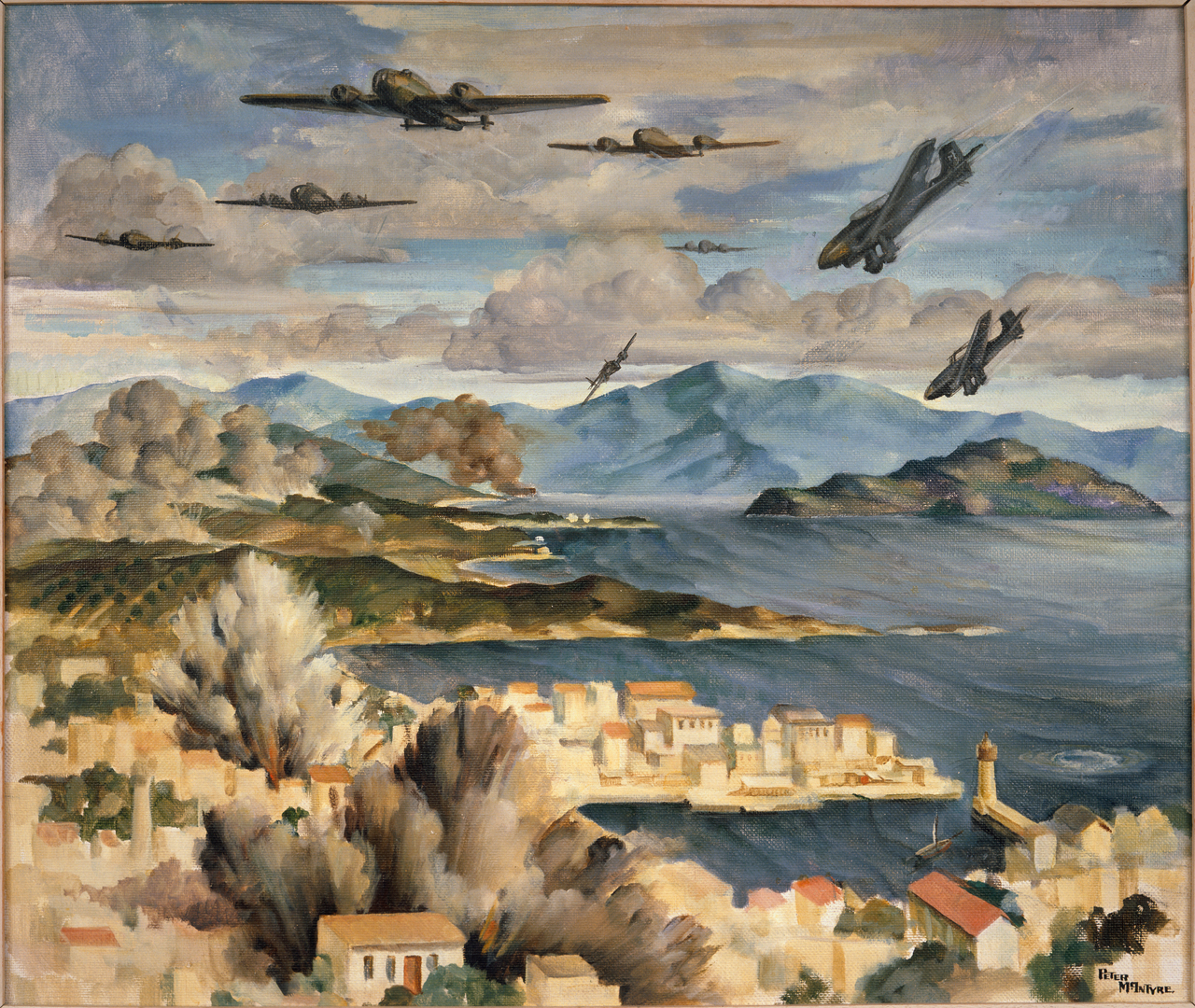
A depiction of the airborne attack by German forces at Canea, a city on Crete, by the official war artist of the 2NZEF, Peter McIntyre

Situated along vital air and sea lanes of communication in the middle of the Mediterranean, Crete was of considerable strategic importance to both sides and, after the conclusion of the campaign in Greece, the Allies fully expected that the Germans would attempt an invasion. The 4th Brigade was stationed as a reserve force in the area around Galatas with the 18th Battalion near the newly established general hospital. When the airborne invasion began on 20 May, the battalion quickly dealt with a company of Fallschirmjäger (paratroopers) that landed near them. It carried out mopping up operations and patrolled the area for the next two days before assisting the 19th Battalion in an attack on Fallschirmjäger that had established a strong defensive position nearby.

Despite heavy casualties during the initial attack, the Germans were able to land reinforcements and the situation on the island quickly deteriorated for the Allies. The brigade had abandoned its initial positions and moved to a new location to the west of Galatas to eliminate the threat that it would become separated from the 5th Infantry Brigade. On 25 May, the 18th Battalion had to deal with a full-scale attack by Fallschirmjäger. This caused heavy casualties and a large portion of one of the battalion's companies was captured. Despite reinforcements arriving from the 20th Battalion and the best efforts of Gray in rounding up stragglers, the Galatas position was breached and the township captured. Some battalion personnel, led by Gray, along with the bulk of the 23rd Battalion, participated in an attack that briefly re-took the township but it later had to be abandoned again after further fighting. The battalion was then withdrawn to the east as the order to evacuate Crete was received, making its way towards Suda Bay, where Allied ships were taking troops off the beaches. Along the way, they were subjected to heavy air raids, one of which killed a company commander, Captain Jack Lyon, the Member of Parliament for the Waitemata electorate.

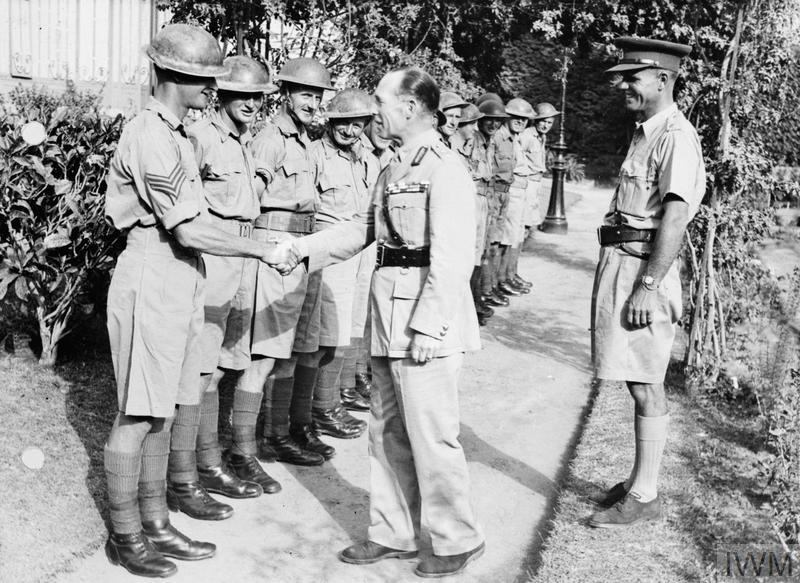
The King of Greece thanking the men who helped him to escape Crete

During the evacuation of the 4th Brigade, which took place from Sfakia on 30–31 May, the 18th Battalion formed a rearguard helping police and maintain order; it was the last battalion of the brigade taken off. One of the battalion's platoons also acted as a bodyguard to the King of Greece during the battle and evacuation. The King subsequently conferred some of the men with Greek decorations. Casualties during the fighting on Crete were heavy for the 18th Battalion, with 105 men killed or missing and 110 more taken prisoner.

== North Africa ==
Back in its former base in Egypt and with its ranks restored with 400 reinforcements that arrived in June, the battalion began intensive weapons training. In September it moved to Baggush where on occasion it worked alongside tanks in training exercises. The 2nd New Zealand Division was now preparing for a role in the upcoming Libyan offensive, and several divisional and brigade level exercises were carried out.

=== Operation Crusader ===
In November 1941, the battalion, now commanded by Lieutenant Colonel Joseph Peart as Gray had been hospitalised, participated in Operation Crusader as part of the British Eighth Army and was engaged in offensive operations towards the Sidi Azeiz area. On the night of 25 November, along with the 20th Battalion, it was tasked with the capture of Belhamed, a hill adjacent to Sidi Rezegh. With two companies leading the battalion's portion of the advance, the objective was captured with a bayonet charge. Peart was wounded during the attack but remained in command. The battalion held the hill for three days and then swapped its positions with the 20th Battalion before, on 30 November, the 15th Panzer Division surrounded and attacked Belhamed. While the 20th Battalion was effectively destroyed, the 18th Battalion, with Peart maintaining tight control of some personnel who were close to panicking, managed to evacuate in time and reached the British 70th Division in Tobruk.

=== Rebuilding ===
At Tobruk and with Gray back in command, the battalion manned the frontlines, fending off German attacks, until 11 December when it was withdrawn to Baggush. Meeting up with the rest of the division, it was brought back up to strength and manned defences to protect the lines of communication to the front. In February 1942, after spending a period of time engaged in training for an amphibious landing behind German lines which never eventuated, the 2nd New Zealand Division was dispatched to Syria to defend against a possible attack through Turkey on the Middle East oilfields by the Germans. Along with the rest of the 4th Brigade the 18th Battalion worked on defences to the north of Damascus before the whole division was recalled to Libya on 17 June following the attack on the Eighth Army's Gazala Line by Panzer Army Africa. It was initially based at Mersa Matruh, but after the fall of Tobruk to Rommel's forces, the division was ordered on 25 June to establish defensive positions at Minqar Qaim. The 18th Battalion was temporarily detached from the rest of the 4th Brigade to act as the main infantry component of the divisional reserve.

On 27 June, the division's defensive positions at Minqar Qaim were encircled by the 21st Panzer Division. The battalion was the lead unit of one of the columns, numbering 900 vehicles and guns, of the division, in the subsequent breakout that night. In the course of this movement, Gray's column ran into an encampment of tanks of the 21st Panzer Division. However, the Germans failed to capitalise on the opportunity and the train of vehicles, with Gray at its head to ensure it did not come to a stop, was able to skirt the tanks with relatively few losses and reach the Alamein lines.

=== El Alamein ===
The battalion was withdrawn from the frontlines after a brief period of recovery at the Kaponga Box. Now commanded by Lieutenant Colonel Ray Lynch due to Gray being promoted to brigadier and given command of the 4th Brigade, (Note: Gray was killed in an air raid shortly afterwards.) it served as security for the divisional headquarters from late June to early July as the entire division relocated several times during this period. On the evening of 14 July, the battalion, now back with its parent brigade, was part of the attack on Ruweisat Ridge, held by the enemy. Although an Italian strongpoint caused the battalion to scatter in piecemeal fashion, it advanced to the western end of the ridge taking several prisoners on the way. A German counterattack in the afternoon of 15 July which overwhelmed the 19th and 20th Battalions also caused heavy losses amongst the 18th Battalion, including Lynch, but many men were able to return to the Allied lines. Following the effective destruction of the 19th and 20th Battalions, the 18th Battalion remained in the field attached to the 5th Brigade. It then supported an attack by the 6th Brigade on El Mreir. Inadequately supported by armour, the attack proved a failure although the battalion escaped with relatively few casualties. It remained in the line throughout August and into September at which time, having been reduced to just 350 personnel, it was withdrawn to Maadi to rejoin the reconstituted 4th Brigade.

== Conversion to armour ==
As the war progressed, the New Zealand government decided to form an armoured brigade to provide tank support to the 2nd New Zealand Division. As a result, the 1st New Zealand Army Tank Brigade was formed in New Zealand. This brigade was still undergoing training in September when it was decided to convert the 4th Brigade to armour instead, thus creating the 4th Armoured Brigade. Personnel were transferred from the tank brigade in New Zealand to bring the 4th Brigade back up to strength. As one of the constituent units of the brigade, the 18th Battalion was officially re-designated the 18th Armoured Regiment, with three squadrons of tanks, on 5 October 1942. One squadron was to be equipped with Crusaders (Note: These were later replaced with Shermans.) while the other two squadrons would operate Shermans. The regiment spent much of the next year in training under the command of Lieutenant Colonel Clive Pleasants, who had taken over command after the death of Lynch. By May 1943, many of the regiment's personnel had been on active duty for well over three years, and the majority of these men were returned to New Zealand on furlough.

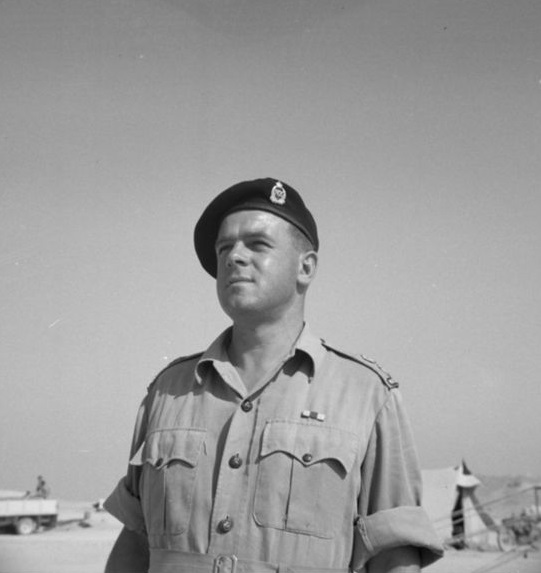
Lieutenant Colonel Clive Pleasants oversaw the conversion of the 18th Battalion from infantry to armour and led it through the early stages of the Italian Campaign

With the close of the North African campaign in May 1943, attention then turned to the European theatre of operations. Despite a preference amongst some sections of the New Zealand government for the 2nd New Zealand Division to be redeployed to the Pacific theatre of operations to fight against the Japanese, it was decided that the division would remain in Europe and continue its service with the Eighth Army. Accordingly, in October, the division was transferred to Italy.

== Italy ==
The 18th Armoured Regiment disembarked at Taranto on 22 October 1943 and gradually travelled north towards the Sangro River, which it duly crossed on 3 December. The advance had been slow due to mine fields and delaying ambushes by the Germans. Pleasants, the regiment's commanding officer, was slightly wounded by artillery fire and Major Hugh Green briefly took over. He was mortally wounded by artillery fire on 3 December at the village of Melone, to the north of the Sangro River. Two days later the regiment, with Pleasants back in command, mounted an attack on the German positions at Melone but this failed and seven tanks became stuck. The crews remained with the tanks until they were recovered at the beginning of 1944.

=== Orsogna ===
In the following weeks, the regiment supported first the 6th, and then the 5th Brigades in their attacks on Orsogna, as part of the Moro River Campaign. The tanks struggled to break into Orsogna and although the infantry made some gains, the German defences were too strong and the attack soon faded into a stalemate, with a number of back and forth actions as winter set in. These movements saw many of the regiment's tanks become stuck in the sodden ground. Offensive operations around Orsogna ceased in late December and the New Zealanders withdrew from the area on 13 January 1944.

Following its withdrawal from the area around Orsogna, the 2nd New Zealand Division was one of a number of divisions that were transferred from the Eighth Army to the Fifth Army, then engaged on the western side of the Apennines. This was part of an overall strategy to breach the Gustav Line and break an otherwise deadlocked Italian front. Together with the 4th Indian Division and supporting British and American artillery, the division formed the New Zealand Corps with Freyberg, now a lieutenant general, in command. The corps moved to Cassino, the defenders of which had resisted Allied forces for several weeks, on 12 February 1944 to replace the American II Corps.

=== Cassino ===
As at Orsogna, the 18th Armoured Regiment was to play a supporting role in the forthcoming attack on Cassino, with the infantry of the 5th and 6th Brigades bearing the brunt of the battle. When the attack began on 15 March, the regiment was initially held as a reserve, ready to exploit any breakthrough by the infantry but this did not eventuate. The infantry struggled to make progress in the face of determined resistance. The regiment's tanks were first used at Cassino as artillery support for two weeks, each squadron being rotated in three-day stints to a position overlooking the town. Then in mid-April, one squadron was detached to remain on the Cassino front while the other two squadrons were withdrawn for training. The regiment remained fragmented into May, for once training was completed, another squadron was detached and sent into Cassino itself to man tanks which had been effectively set up as pillboxes.

By the end of May, the regiment was reunited and at full strength. It was briefly detached from the 2nd New Zealand Division and, placed under the direction of the 8th Indian Division, participated in operations north of the Liri Valley. Returning to the control of the 2nd New Zealand Division, it supported the infantry brigades as the New Zealanders advanced to Florence, duly entering the city in August. After this, the division was transferred to the I Canadian Corps, then on the Adriatic Coast, and advanced up to Rimini. On 19 and 20 October, the 4th Armoured Brigade was involved in its first and only action as a brigade in an attack towards the Savio River, with the 18th Armoured Regiment on the right flank. This was primarily a tank action, in contrast to previous battles in which the armour supported the infantry. The attack was a success and pushed the Germans across the Savio, although their progress had been slower than expected because of poor weather and muddy conditions.

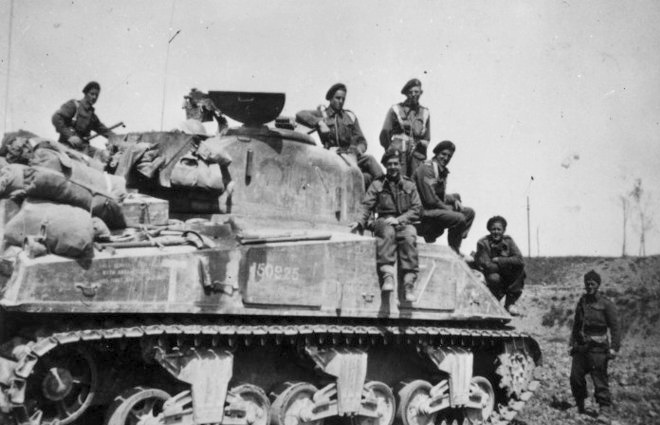
A Sherman of the 18th Armoured Regiment ready to cross the Po River in Italy

After the crossing of the Savio, the 2nd New Zealand Division was withdrawn from the front for rest and refit. During this period, the regiment received upgunned Shermans; these new tanks were known as the Firefly. After a month, the New Zealanders returned to the front at Romagna and they advanced to the Lamone River in anticipation of a crossing but instead supported the British 46th Division in its attack across the river on 3 December. During this operation, the tanks of the 18th Regiment fired 6,200 shells in a single day. It then attacked towards the Senio River, supporting infantry from the 5th Brigade. The division was positioned along the Senio River for three months, over the worst of the winter period. The regiment spent most of this time behind the lines at Forlì and Faenza, or on short spells on the Senio frontlines.

Relieved by a Polish unit in March 1945, the regiment returned to the front lines in early April after a period of rest. It made a series of advances against the retreating German rearguard and on 2 May, the 2nd New Zealand Division entered Trieste. While most of the German garrison quickly surrendered, it was necessary to deal with some diehard elements who refused to surrender to either the New Zealanders or the Yugoslav partisans also present in the city. The partisans were reluctant to allow Germans to surrender to the New Zealanders, and the regiment remained in Trieste for several weeks until the large numbers of Yugoslav partisans withdrew.

Not required for service in the Pacific theatre of operations, the regiment was disbanded in December 1945. During the war, the 18th Battalion and its successor, the 18th Armoured Regiment, lost nearly 320 officers and men either killed in action or who later died of their wounds. Of the exactly 350 personnel made prisoners of war, a further 21 men died while in captivity.

== Honours ==
Seven members of the battalion, including three of its commanders, (Note: Parata, Pleasants, and Ferguson.) were awarded the Distinguished Service Order while another member was appointed an Officer of the Order of the British Empire and a second was made a member of the same order. Nine officers were awarded the Military Cross while two others received the Greek Military Cross. Three soldiers received the Distinguished Conduct Medal and 26 others the Military Medal. Twenty-one soldiers received awards of the Greek Silver and bronze medals.

The 18th Battalion and its successor, the 18th Armoured Regiment, was awarded the following battle honours:

Mount Olympus, Servia Pass, Platamon Tunnel, Tempe Gorge, Elasson, Molos, Greece 1941, Crete, Maleme, Galatas, Canea, 42nd Street, Withdrawal to Sphakia, Middle East 1941–44, Tobruk 1941, Sidi Rezegh 1941, Omars, Belhamed, Mersa Matruh, Minqar Qaim, Defence of Alamein Line, Ruweisat Ridge, El Mreir, Alam el Halfa, North Africa 1940–42, The Sangro, Castel Frentano, Orsogna, Advance to Florence, San Michele, Paula Line, Celle, Pisciatello, The Senio, Santerno Crossing, Bologna, Idice Bridgehead, Italy 1943–45. (Note: The battle honours awarded for its work as an infantry battalion were entrusted to the Waikato, Auckland, Hauraki and Northland regiments. Those awarded to the 18th Armoured Regiment are also entrusted to the Waikato Regiment.)

== Commanding officers ==
The following officers served as commanding officer of the 18th Battalion:

- Lieutenant Colonel John Russell Gray (September 1939 – July 1941; August – November 1941; March – June 1942);
- Lieutenant Colonel Joseph Norris Peart (July – August 1941; November 1941 – March 1942);
- Lieutenant Colonel Raymond James Lynch (June – July 1942);
- Lieutenant Colonel Clive Lochiel Pleasants (July 1942 – December 1943; January – March 1944);
- Lieutenant Colonel John Burns Ferguson (December 1943 – January 1944; July 1944 – January 1945); (Note: Ferguson had the rank of major during his first period in command of the battalion.)
- Lieutenant Colonel Hugh Amuri Robinson (March – July 1944; March – December 1945);
- Lieutenant Colonel John McMahon Elliott (February – March 1945);
- Lieutenant Colonel Hoani Haereroa Parata (March – May 1945);
- Lieutenant Colonel Arthur Scoltock Playle (June – December 1945).
