= John Baddeley =

John Baddeley may refer to:

- Jack Baddeley (1881–1953), born John Marcus Baddeley, Australian politician and member of the New South Wales Legislative Assembly
- Sir John Baddeley, 1st Baronet (1842–1926), English baronet and 593rd Lord Mayor of London
- John Baddeley, 2nd, 3rd and 4th Baronets, of the Baddeley baronets
- John F. Baddeley (1854–1940), British traveller, scholar and journalist, best known by his works on Russia and the Caucasus region.
- John Baddeley (1933–2025), born Edward John Baddeley, British actor, voice actor and author.

== See also ==
- Baddeley (disambiguation)
- Jon Baddeley, British TV personality, regular contributor to the Antiques Roadshow
