= Rusty Page =

New Zealand Army officer and rugby union player

Rusty Page CBE DSO
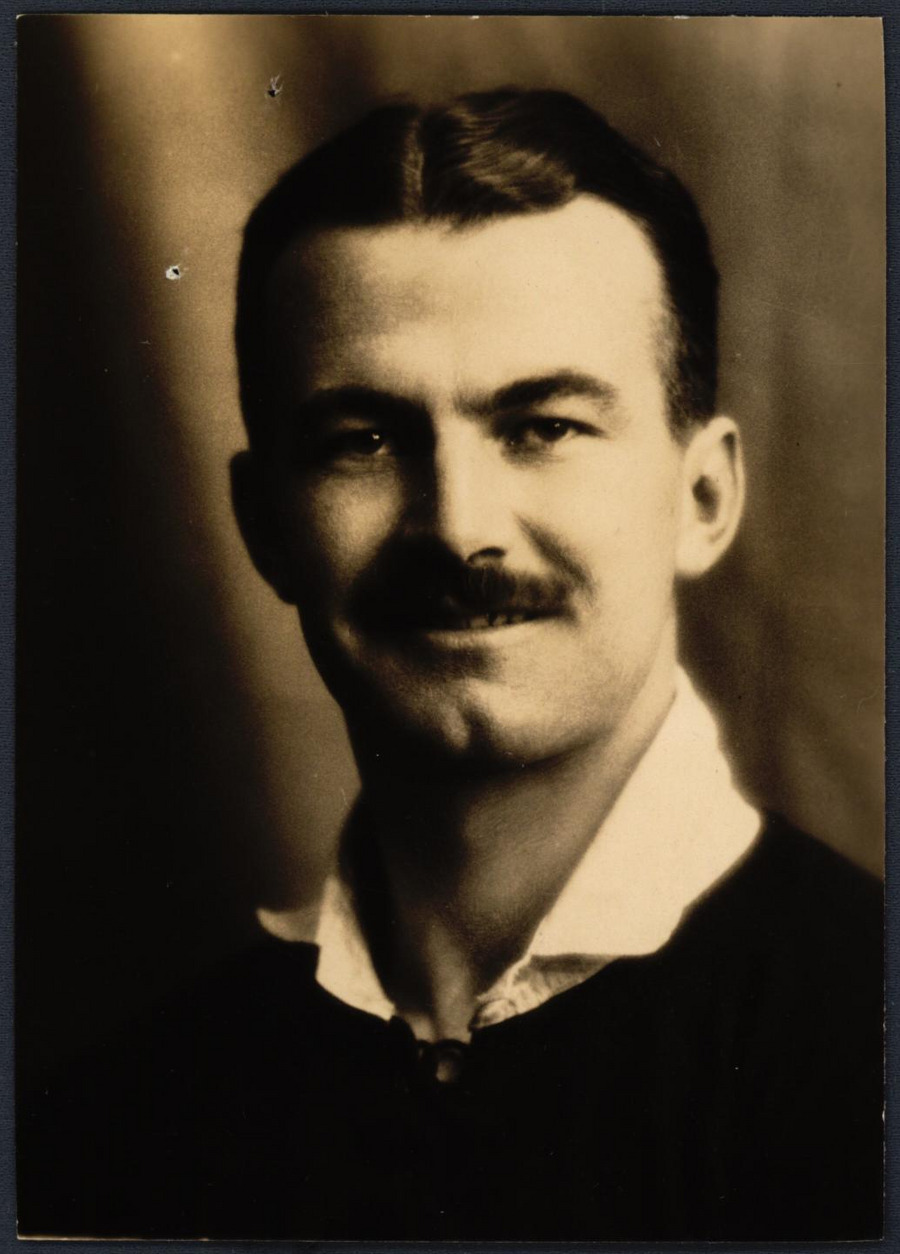
- Page in 1935
- Born: James Russell Page; 10 May 1908 Dunedin, New Zealand
- Died: 22 May 1985 (aged 77) Auckland, New Zealand
- Height: 1.70 m (5 ft 7 in)
- Weight: 73 kg (161 lb)
- School: Southland Boys' High School
- Occupation: Army officer

Rugby union career
- Position(s): First five-eighth Centre
Amateur team(s)
Years	Team	Apps	(Points)
- London Scottish
Provincial / State sides
Years	Team	Apps	(Points)
1930–35	Wellington	28	
International career
Years	Team	Apps	(Points)
1931–35	New Zealand	6	(3)

James Russell "Rusty" Page CBE DSO (10 May 1908 – 22 May 1985) was a New Zealand army officer, and rugby union player and administrator.

== Early life and family ==
Born in Dunedin in 1908, Page was the son of John and Helen Stuart Page (née Caradus). From 1922 to 1926 he was educated at Southland Boys' High School, where he was junior athletics, shooting and tennis champion in 1922. In 1926 he was captain of the school's 1st XV rugby team, head prefect and senior athletics champion. The recipient of a New Zealand military scholarship, Page undertook army officer training at the Royal Military College, Sandhurst from 1927 to 1928. His engagement to Betty Penston Blundell was announced in May 1936, and the couple married at West Wickham in south-west London in July that year.

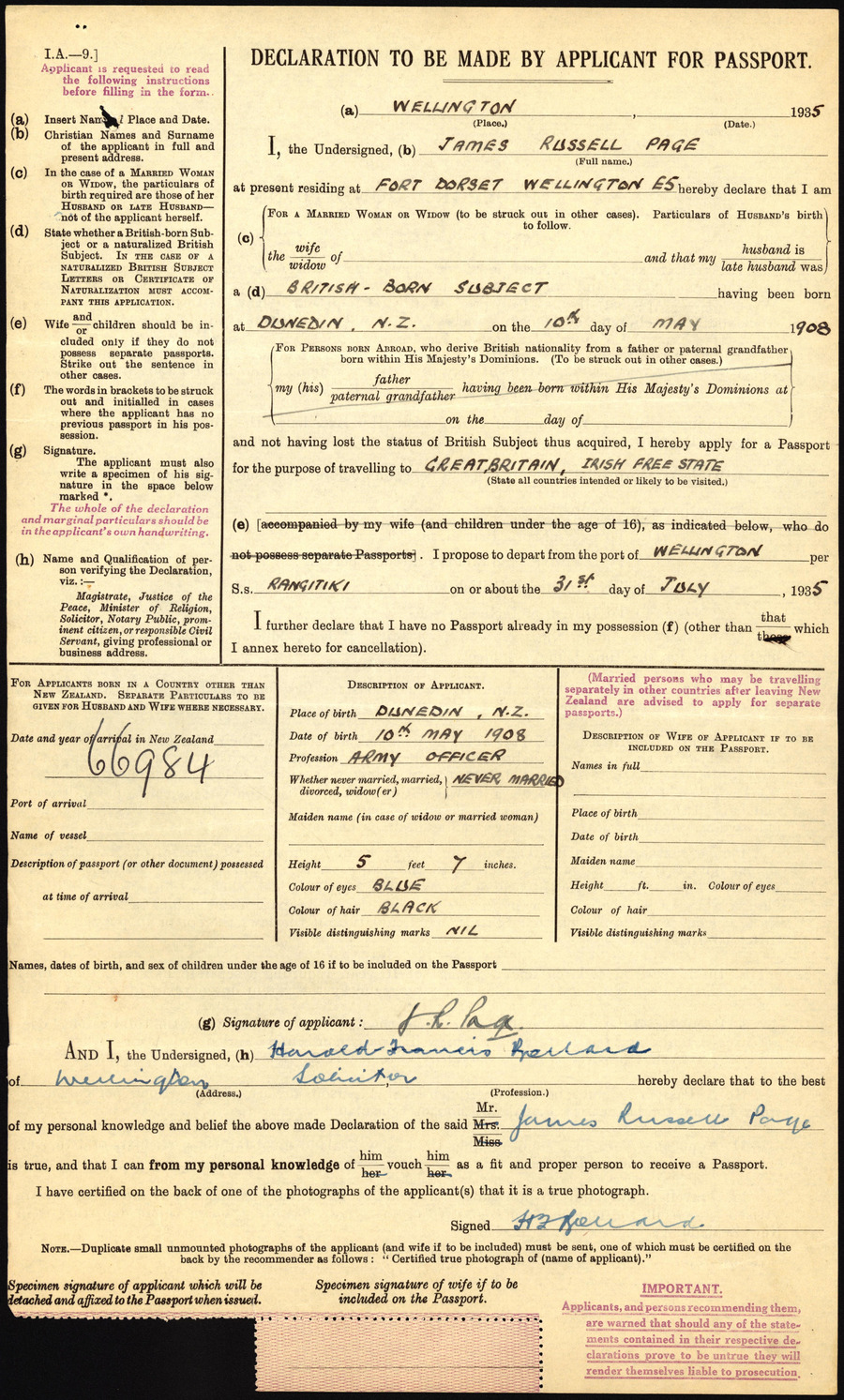
James Russell Page passport application (1935)

== Rugby union ==
Primarily a first five-eighth, Page played for London Scottish while at Sandhurst. He was a reserve for Scotland in one match, but did not take the field. Returning to New Zealand in 1930, Page represented Wellington at a provincial level, and was a member of the New Zealand national side, the All Blacks, from 1931 to 1935. He played 18 matches for the All Blacks—three of which were as captain—including six internationals.

He later served on the executives of the Wellington Rugby Football Union (WRFU) from 1947 to 1949 and the New Zealand Rugby Union from 1953 to 1954. He was also president of the WRFU in 1967.

== Military career ==
Page was commissioned as a second lieutenant in the New Zealand Staff Corps in August 1928. He served as adjutant at Fort Dorset on the Miramar Peninsula in 1935, and with the Royal New Zealand Artillery, and, as a lieutenant colonel, following the outbreak of World War II was appointed commanding officer of 26 (NZ) Battalion when it was formed in May 1940. He saw active service with the Battalion in Greece and North Africa. He was wounded on 27 November 1941 at Sidi Rezegh during Operation Crusader and was invalided back to New Zealand.

In recognition of his gallant and distinguished service in the Middle East, and in particular in November 1941 at Sidi Rezegh where he was wounded, Page was appointed a Companion of the Distinguished Service Order in March 1942. His investiture by the Governor-General, Lord Newall, took place at a ceremony at Wellington Town Hall on 2 August 1944. Part of his citation read:

On the night 26/27 November the Battalion undertook another night advance against the strongly held enemy positions on the escarpment. There was a very large number of machine and anti-tank guns in the enemy position and both class of weapons were used with deadly effect against our troops. The nature of the attack and the time at which it was launched precluded any opportunity of supporting it by Artillery and machine-gun fire. The enemy gunners remained in action at their posts until our infantry had advanced literally right up to the muzzles of the guns and the battle was certainly the fiercest that this Brigade has ever experienced. Lieutenant Colonel Page was in the forefront of the attack and in the course of it he was very severely wounded. His magnificent courage and leadership were the outstanding factors which contributed to the great success which was achieved. Throughout all these operations Lieutenant Colonel Page was an inspiration to all his troops and to the whole Brigade Group. In every action he was everywhere on the battlefield. His cheerfulness under very trying circumstances, his utter disregard of danger, his indomitable determination to win and the skill with which he disposed of his forces were over and over again responsible for the very fine achievements of the battalion he commanded.

For the remainder of the war, Page held various posts in New Zealand, including inspector of training from August 1942. From January 1943 he was stationed at Army Headquarters in Wellington. He was later commandant of the New Zealand Northern Military District from 1950 to 1952, when he was appointed adjutant-general at Army Headquarters.

In 1953, Page was awarded the Queen Elizabeth II Coronation Medal, and he was appointed a Commander of the Military Division of the Order of the British Empire in the 1954 New Year Honours.

Page was appointed quartermaster-general in 1956 and New Zealand joint services liaison in Canberra in 1960. He retired from the army with the rank of brigadier in 1963. He died in Auckland in 1985 at the age of 77.
