= Ces Badeley =

New Zealand rugby union player

- Born: Cecil Edward Oliver "Ces" Badeley; 7 November 1896 Auckland, New Zealand
- Died: 10 November 1986 (aged 90) Auckland, New Zealand
- School: Auckland Grammar School
- Notable relative(s): Vic Badeley & Sydney Badeley (brothers)

Rugby union career
- Position: Fiveeights
International career
Years	Team	Apps	(Points)
1920,1921,1924	New Zealand		

Cecil Edward Oliver "Ces" Badeley (7 November 1896 – 10 November 1986) was an All Blacks rugby union player from New Zealand. He was a five-eighths.

He played 15 matches for the All Blacks, including two tests. He toured Australia in 1920, and in 1921 played in two tests against them. He captained the team to Australia in 1924, but a recurring knee injury meant he did not captain the 1924-25 tour of Britain and France.

He was born and died in Auckland. He went to Auckland Grammar School, and served in the Army in World War I.

His brother Vic Badeley was an All Black in 1922.
