= John Henry Howell =

Technical college principal, Quaker

John Henry Howell (31 October 1869 – 20 June 1944) was a New Zealand technical college principal and Quaker. He was born in Frampton Cotterell, Gloucestershire, England on 31 October 1869.
