= Sydney Badeley =

New Zealand cricketer

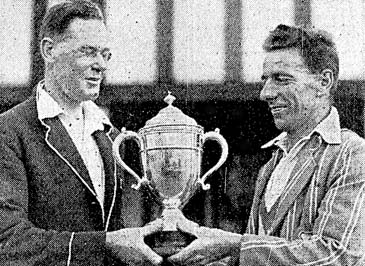
- Badeley (captain of South Auckland, right) passes the Hawke Cup on to Edgar Neale (captain of Nelson, left) in January 1933.

Personal information
- Full name: Sydney Albert Robert Badeley
- Born: 7 April 1902; Auckland, New Zealand
- Died: 28 December 1981 (aged 79); Auckland, New Zealand
- Source: Cricinfo, 2 June 2016

Sydney Albert Robert Badeley (7 April 1902 – 28 December 1981) was a New Zealand cricketer. He played four first-class matches for Auckland in 1929/30.

Two brothers Cecil Badeley and Vic Badeley were notable rugby union players (All Blacks).

== See also ==
- List of Auckland representative cricketers
