= Rex Baddeley =

New Zealand cricketer (born 1941)

Rex Allen Baddeley (born 6 November 1941 in Whanganui) is a former New Zealand cricketer who played 13 first-class matches for the Auckland Aces in Plunket Shield beginning in the 1969–70 season and ending in the 1971–72 season.
