= Vic Badeley =

New Zealand rugby union player

- Born: Victor Ivan "Vic" Badeley; 22 November 1898 Auckland, New Zealand
- Died: 19 February 1971 (aged 72) Auckland, New Zealand
- School: Auckland Grammar School
- Notable relative(s): Ces Badeley & Sydney Badeley (brothers)

Rugby union career
- Position: Threequarters
International career
Years	Team	Apps	(Points)
1922	New Zealand		

Victor Ivan Badeley (22 November 1898 – 19 February 1971) was an All Blacks rugby union player from New Zealand. He was a three-quarter. He toured Australia in 1922, when no tests were played.

He suffered a head injury during the 1924 All Black trials, which ended his rugby career.

He was born and died in Auckland, and went to Auckland Grammar School.

His brother Cecil Badeley was an All Black in 1920, 1921 and 1924.
