= Frederick Henry Baddeley =

English military engineer and geologist (1794–1879)

- Born: 4 December 1794; London, England
- Died: 4 May 1879 (aged 84); Stanley House, Havre des Pas, St Helier, Jersey
- Military career
- Allegiance: United Kingdom
- Branch: Board of Ordnance; British Army
- Years of service: 1814–1856
- Rank: Major General
- Service number: 509
- Unit: Corps of Royal Engineers
- Commands: CRE, New South Wales, 1849–1851; CRE, Kilkenny District, 1851–1852; CRE, New Zealand, 1853–1856
- Campaigns: Netherlands and France, 1815–1816
- Memorials: Explorers of Muskoka and Haliburton waymark, Ontario, Canada

Major General Frederick Henry Baddeley (4 December 1794 – 4 May 1879), born Frederick Henry Clinton-Baddeley, youngest son of Sir Henry Clinton and his partner, Mary Baddeley (1756 – 27 March 1820), was a British military engineer of the Corps of Royal Engineers with his early service being in the Napoleonic Wars including the capture of Paris in 1815. He then did a tour in the West Indies from 1817 to 1819, and in 1821 was assigned to Quebec City in Lower Canada.

Most of his important work in Canada had to do with the geology of much of southeastern Canada. British military officers, with Baddeley being considered one of the best, did extensive geological studies of this huge area. His tour in Canada ended in 1839 and during his stay in Canada, he pioneered a valuable body of geological and other engineering work.

Baddeley served as Commanding Royal Engineer in New Zealand from September 1853 to February 1856, and was promoted to colonel on 28 November 1854. In 1855 he superintended the construction of the Marsland Hill barracks, New Plymouth.

== Publications ==
- Baddeley, Frederick Henry (1829). "ART. VI.—Geology of a Portion of the Labrador Coast". Transactions of the Literary and Historical Society of Quebec. 1. Quebec: 71–79.
- Baddeley, Frederick Henry (1829). "ART. VII.—Lieut Baddeley on the Geognosy of a Part of the Saguenay Country". Transactions of the Literary and Historical Society of Quebec. 1. Quebec: 79–166.
- Baddeley, Frederick Henry (1830). "ART. XIX.—Mineralogical examination of the Sulphate of Strontian, from Kingston, (UC); with miscellaneous notices of the Geology of the vicinity". The American Journal of Science and Arts. 18. New Haven: 104–109.
- Baddeley, Frederick Henry (1830). Mineralogical Examination of the Sulphate of Strontian from Kingston, and on the Red Colour of Flame as produced by Strontian and as characteristic of Minerals of that Genus.
- Baddeley, Frederick Henry (1831). "An Essay on the Localities of Metallic Minerals in the Canadas: with Some Notices of their Geological Associations and Situation, &c". Transactions of the Literary and Historical Society of Quebec. 2. Quebec: 332–426.
- Baddeley, Frederick Henry (1831). "Additional Notes on the Geognosy of Saint Paul's Bay". Transactions of the Literary and Historical Society of Quebec. 2. Quebec: 76–94.
- Baddeley, Frederick Henry (1837). "On the Magdalen Islands, Being the Substance of Four Reports". Transactions of the Literary and Historical Society of Quebec. 3. Quebec: 128–190.
- Baddeley, Frederick Henry (1837). "A Geological Sketch of the Most South-eastern Portion of Lower Canada". Transactions of the Literary and Historical Society of Quebec. 3. Quebec: 27–28.
- Baddeley, Frederick Henry (1843). "Article 10.—Tabular View of Minerals which Descrepitate with Heat". Transactions of the Literary and Historical Society of Quebec. 4 (1). Quebec: 95–118.
