= Thomas Baddeley (priest) =

Thomas Baddeley (1786 or 1787–1823), was an English Roman Catholic priest in Manchester.

Baddeley was the author of the Sure Way to find out the True Religion, a colloquial defence of Roman Catholic principles, largely mingled with invective against Protestantism. The author was stated to be dead in 1825. The tract reached a seventh edition in 1847, and provoked several replies.
