= Albert Kesselring =

German military officer (1885–1960)

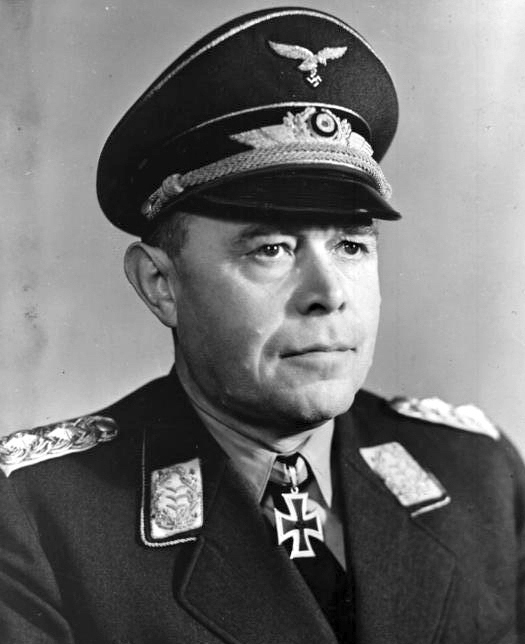
- Kesselring in 1940
- Born: 30 November 1885; Marktsteft, then part of the Kingdom of Bavaria
- Died: 15 July 1960 (aged 74); Bad Nauheim, Hessen, West Germany
- Military career
- Allegiance: Kingdom of Bavaria; German Empire; Weimar Republic; Nazi Germany
- Branch: Bavarian Army; Imperial German Army; Reichsheer; Luftwaffe
- Service years: 1904–1945
- Rank: Generalfeldmarschall
- Nicknames: Smiling Albert; Uncle Albert
- Commands: Luftflotte 1; Luftflotte 2; OB South; Army Group C; OB West
- Conflicts: World War I; Western Front; Eastern Front; World War II; European Theatre; Invasion of Poland; Western Front; Battle of France; Battle of Britain; Mediterranean Front; Siege of Malta; North African campaign; Eastern Front; Operation Barbarossa; German-Soviet Air War; Battle of Moscow; Italian campaign; Central European campaign
- Awards: Knight's Cross of the Iron Cross with Oak Leaves, Swords and Diamonds
- Criminal information
- Conviction: War crimes
- Penalty: Death; commuted to life imprisonment; further commuted 21 years' imprisonment

Albert Kesselring (30 November 1885 – 15 July 1960) was a German military officer who served in the Luftwaffe during World War II. In a career which spanned both world wars, Kesselring eventually reached the rank of the Generalfeldmarschall (Field marshal) and became one of Nazi Germany's most highly decorated commanders.

Kesselring joined the Bavarian Army as an officer cadet in 1904, serving in the artillery branch. He completed training as a balloon observer in 1912. During World War I, he served on both the Western and Eastern fronts and was posted to the Army Staff, despite not having attended the War Academy. Kesselring served in the Reichswehr after the war, but was discharged in 1933 to become head of the Department of Administration at the Ministry of Aviation, where he became involved in the re-establishment of the German aviation industry and the laying of the foundations for the Luftwaffe, serving as its chief of staff from 1936 to 1938.

During World War II, he commanded Luftwaffe forces in the German invasions of Poland and France, the Battle of Britain and the invasion of the Soviet Union. As Wehrmacht Commander-in-Chief South, he was the overall German commander in the Mediterranean theatre, which included the North African campaign. Kesselring conducted a defensive campaign against Allied forces in Italy, being involved in ordering several massacres, until he was injured in an accident in October 1944. In his final campaign of the war, he commanded German forces on the Western Front. During the war, he won the respect of his Allied opponents for his military accomplishments.

After the war, Kesselring was convicted of war crimes and sentenced to death for ordering the murder of 335 Italian civilians in the Ardeatine massacre, and for inciting and ordering his troops to kill civilians as part of reprisals against the Italian resistance movement. The sentence was subsequently commuted to life imprisonment. A political and media campaign resulted in his release in 1952, ostensibly on health grounds. He published his memoirs, Soldat bis zum letzten Tag ("A Soldier to the Last Day"), in 1953. Kesselring accepted the honorary presidency of three veterans' organisations: the Luftwaffenring, consisting of Luftwaffe veterans; the Verband Deutsches Afrikakorps, the veterans' association of the Afrika Korps; and, most controversially, the right-wing Der Stahlhelm, Bund der Frontsoldaten before dying in 1960.

== Early life ==
Albert Kesselring was born in Marktsteft, then part of the Kingdom of Bavaria, on 30 November 1885, (Note: Some references erroneously give his birth date as 20 November. However, Kesselring testified under oath that he was born on 30 November 1885, the date in his Army personnel file. Some sources incorrectly give his first name as Albrecht or Alfred instead of Albert or add a 'von' to his name. He did sometimes spell his name with an eszett (Keßelring), a variant his father preferred.) the son of Carl Adolf Kesselring, a schoolmaster and town councillor, and his wife Rosina, Carl's second cousin. Albert's early years were spent in Marktsteft, where relatives had operated a brewery since 1688.

Graduating from the Christian Ernestinum Secondary School in Bayreuth in 1904, Kesselring joined the German Army as a Fahnenjunker (officer cadet) in the 2nd Bavarian Foot Artillery Regiment. The regiment was based at Metz and was responsible for maintaining its forts. He remained with the regiment until 1915, except for periods at the Military Academy from 1905 to 1906, after which he received his commission as a Leutnant (lieutenant), and at the School of Artillery and Engineering in Munich from 1909 to 1910.

In 1910, Kesselring married Luise Anna Pauline (Liny) Keyssler, the daughter of an apothecary from Bayreuth. Their marriage was childless, but in the 1930s they adopted Rudolf Rainer Keßelring (b. 7 December 1934 in Bad Kissingen; d 25 September 2013 in Aufkirchen/Berg), the son of Albert's second cousin Kurt Kesselring. In 1912, Kesselring completed training as a balloon observer in a dirigible section—an early sign of an interest in aviation. Kesselring's superiors considered posting him to the School of Artillery and Engineering as an instructor because of his expertise in "the interplay between tactics and technology".

== World War I ==
During World War I, Kesselring served with his regiment in Lorraine until the end of 1914, when he was transferred to the 1st Bavarian Foot Artillery, which formed part of the Sixth Army. On 19 May 1916, he was promoted to Hauptmann (captain). In 1916 he was transferred again, to the 3rd Bavarian Foot Artillery. He distinguished himself in the Battle of Arras in 1917, "by his tireless and assiduous work, and by the preparation of clear and carefully constructed orders", despite being on duty for over twenty hours, and succeeded in halting the British advance. For his services on the Western Front, he was decorated with the Iron Cross, 1st Class.

In 1917, he was posted to the General Staff, despite not having attended the Bavarian War Academy. He served on the Eastern Front on the staff of the 2nd Bavarian Landwehr Division. His experience here shaped his subsequent anti-communist political outlook. In January 1918, he returned to the Western Front as a staff officer with the II and III Royal Bavarian Corps.

== Between the wars ==
=== Reichswehr ===
After the war, Kesselring was involved in the demobilisation of III Royal Bavarian Corps in the Nuremberg area, as mandated by the Treaty of Versailles. A dispute with the leader of the local right-wing paramilitary Freikorps led to the issuance of an arrest warrant for his alleged involvement in a putsch against the command of III Bavarian Corps, and Kesselring was thrown into prison. He was soon released, but his superior, Major Hans Seyler, censured him for having "failed to display the requisite discretion".

From 1919 to 1922, Kesselring served as a battery commander with the 24th Artillery Regiment. He joined the Reichswehr on 1 October 1922 and was posted to the Military Training Department at the Ministry of the Reichswehr in Berlin. He remained at this post until 1929 when he returned to Bavaria as commander of Wehrkreis VII in Munich. In his time with the Reichswehr Ministry, Kesselring was involved in the organisation of the army, trimming staff overheads to produce the best possible army with the limited resources available.

He helped re-organise the Ordnance Department, laying the groundwork for the research and development efforts that would produce new weapons. He was involved in secret military manoeuvres held in the Soviet Union in 1924 and the so-called Great Plan for a 102-division army, which was prepared in 1923 and 1924. Following the recommendation of a commission headed by Kesselring in 1929, aviation officers and agencies were consolidated into an inspectorate of aviation. After another brief stint at the Ministry of the Reichswehr, Kesselring was promoted to Oberstleutnant (lieutenant colonel) in 1930 and spent two years in Dresden with the 4th Artillery Regiment.

=== Luftwaffe ===
Kesselring was discharged from the Reichswehr in 1933 against his wishes, and appointed head of the Department of Administration at the Reich Commissariat for Aviation (Reichskommissariat für die Luftfahrt), the forerunner of the Reich Air Ministry (Reichsluftfahrtministerium) (RLM), with the rank of Oberst (colonel) in 1934. Since the Treaty of Versailles forbade Germany from establishing an air force, this was nominally a civilian agency. The Luftwaffe was not formally established until 26 February 1935. He was involved in the re-establishment of the aviation industry and the construction of secret factories, forging alliances with industrialists and aviation engineers.

Promotion in the Luftwaffe was rapid; Kesselring was promoted to Generalmajor on 1 October 1934, and Generalleutnant on 1 April 1936. Like other generals of Nazi Germany, he received personal monthly payments from Adolf Hitler, in Kesselring's case 6,000 ℛ︁ℳ︁, a considerable sum at the time. (Note: Many other generals received significantly more: Erhard Milch, Gerd von Rundstedt and Günther von Kluge each received a total of 250,000 ℛ︁ℳ︁; Ewald von Kleist was given 480,000 ℛ︁ℳ︁; and Wilhelm Keitel asked for and got a tract of confiscated land worth 730,000 ℛ︁ℳ︁.)

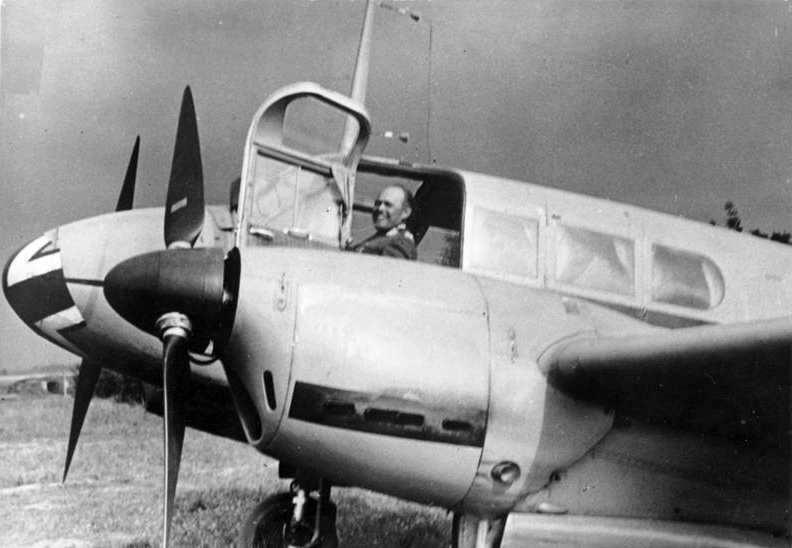
Kesselring at the controls of a Siebel Fh 104 aircraft

At the age of 48, Kesselring learned to fly, following the old military doctrine that officers should not ask their men to do anything they would not do themselves. He later stated that first-hand knowledge of all aspects of aviation was essential to being able to command airmen, although he was well aware that latecomers like himself did not impress the old pioneers or the young aviators. He qualified in various single- and multi-engine aircraft and continued flying three or four days per week until March 1945.

Following the death of Generalleutnant Walther Wever in an air crash, Kesselring became Chief of Staff of the Luftwaffe on 3 June 1936. In that post, he oversaw the expansion of the Luftwaffe, the acquisition of new aircraft types such as the Messerschmitt Bf 109 fighter and Junkers Ju 87 "Stuka" dive-bomber, and the development of paratroops.

Kesselring's main operational task during this time was the support of the Condor Legion in the Spanish Civil War. His tenure was marred by personal and professional conflicts with his superior, General der Flieger Erhard Milch, and Kesselring asked to be relieved. His conflict with Milch was in contrast to his predecessor, Wever. Overall it has been surmised that Kesselring was not an effective chief of staff, primarily because he lacked Wever's strategic insight. Kesselring requested a transfer to a field command, and the head of the Luftwaffe, Hermann Göring, gave him command of Luftgau III (Air District III) in Dresden. Kesselring was promoted to General der Flieger in 1937, and became commander of Luftflotte 1 in 1938, until January 1940. He was succeeded in his role by Hans-Jürgen Stumpff.

=== Impact on Luftwaffe doctrine ===
In the area of aerial doctrine, Kesselring has been described by James Corum as a "worthy successor" to Wever. Like many ex-Army officers, Kesselring saw the importance of air power in the tactical role, providing support to land operations. In the historiography of the Luftwaffe, Kesselring and Hans-Jürgen Stumpff are usually blamed for neglecting strategic bombing while over-focusing on close air support for the army. However, the two most prominent enthusiasts for the focus on ground-support operations (either close air support or air interdiction) were Hugo Sperrle and Hans Jeschonnek. These men were long-time professional airmen involved in German air services since their early careers.

Kesselring strongly supported the program to produce a long-range heavy bomber. As chief of staff he supported new technologies and training for bomb aimers and navigators to carry out effective long-range bombing missions and at high altitudes. In March 1939 Kesselring expressed his doubt this could be done accurately at night or in bad weather. German scientists succeeded in proving otherwise, and developed a successful radio navigation system.

The Luftwaffe was not pressured into ground support operations due to demands from the army, or because it was led by ex-army personnel. Interdiction and close air support were operations that suited the Luftwaffe's existing approach to warfare: a culture of joint inter-service operations rather than independent strategic air campaigns. Moreover, many officers in the Luftwaffe command believed medium bombers to be sufficient in power for use in strategic bombing operations against Germany's most likely enemies; Britain and France. The cancellation of Wever's long-range Ural bomber project in April 1937 was opposed by Kesselring. On 2 June the RLM relented and ordered a better-performing design, which became the Heinkel He 177. The project took shape as Kesselring left office.

== World War II ==
=== Poland ===
In the Polish campaign that began World War II, Kesselring's Luftflotte 1 operated in support of Army Group North, commanded by Generaloberst Fedor von Bock. Kesselring had 1,105 aircraft in comparison to Alexander Löhr's 729 with Luftflotte 4 in support of Generaloberst Gerd von Rundstedt's Army Group South. Kesselring gave a high priority to attacks on airfields. Strategic targets like aircraft and aircraft-related armament factories were attacked during the air superiority mission and formed part of it. Once the air battle was won, only then did the Luftwaffe direct its attention to close air support and air interdiction.

The tactical and operational focus of the Luftwaffe in the first days of the campaign was not a repudiation of strategic bombardment. The planned strategic bombing of Warsaw (Operation Wasserkante), scheduled to commence on 1 September, was postponed due to bad weather. By the time the weather cleared, the army support operations were going so well there was a reluctance to shift emphasis.

The Luftwaffe had difficulty locating the dispersed Polish airfields, and only 24 Polish aircraft were destroyed on the ground. The counter-air campaign was not as successful as it may have been due to faulty fuses on bombs–a lesson soon rectified. Air superiority was accomplished by destroying communications, which increased the pace of the army advance and enabled ground forces to overrun Polish airstrips and early warning sites. Sporadic Polish aerial resistance continued until 14 September. The Polish Air Force earned Kesselring's respect and he considered that Polish pilots and aircraft were not inferior. Kesselring himself was shot down during the campaign, the first of the five times he was shot down during World War II.

Although not under Bock's command, Kesselring's purpose was to support Army Group North in closing the Polish Corridor from the third day, with emphasis thereafter on supporting the 3rd Army as it advanced along the Vistula to isolate Warsaw from the east. From 8 September Kesselring began interdiction operations against bridges as German forces advanced on Warsaw. When a powerful Polish counter-attack created a crisis, he contributed Fliegerdivision 1 to the Battle of the Bzura. The division contained 70 per cent of his dive-bombers and was assigned to Löhr on 6 September. The air attacks assisted in the destruction of two Polish armies.

On 16/17 September the air fleets were notified of the Soviet invasion of Poland. Luftflotte 1 support operations against troop concentrations ceased in central and southern Poland to avoid friendly-fire incidents. Kesselring attempted to crush Polish resistance by making a series of air attacks against Warsaw in the final week of September. With the military campaign virtually over, Polish resistance was confined to the Hel Peninsula, Warsaw, and Modlin. Kesselring's air fleet was assigned to the north of the city. In the ensuing attacks, approximately 10 per cent of the city's buildings were destroyed and 40 per cent damaged. The bombing killed between 20,000 and 25,000 civilians. Kesselring insisted that only military targets were attacked, but the lack of precision munitions made the bombing indiscriminate and militarily ineffective. For his part in the Polish campaign, Kesselring was personally awarded the Knight's Cross of the Iron Cross by Hitler.

=== France and Low Countries ===
Kesselring's Luftflotte 1 was not involved in the preparations for the campaigns in the west. Instead, it remained in the east on garrison duty, establishing new airbases and an air-raid precautions network in occupied Poland. However, after the Mechelen Incident, in which an aircraft made a forced landing in Belgium with copies of the German invasion plan, Göring relieved the commander of Luftflotte 2, General der Flieger Hellmuth Felmy, of his command and appointed Kesselring in his place on 15 January 1940. Arriving in the west, Kesselring found Luftflotte 2 assigned to support Bock's Army Group B.

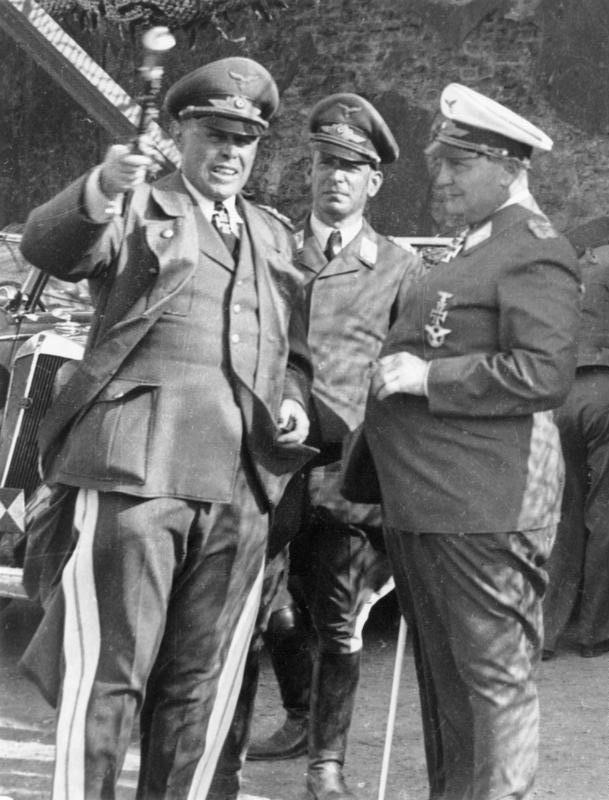
Kesselring (left), with his chief of staff, Wilhelm Speidel (centre), and Hermann Göring (right) – 1940

Kesselring was more heavily committed in the Low Countries, with elements of his air command underpinning the attack on the Netherlands—Battle of the Netherlands—and Battle of Belgium. This included an airborne operation around Rotterdam and The Hague to seize airfields and bridges in the "Fortress Holland" area. The paratroopers were from General der Flieger Kurt Student's airborne forces. Air and ground operations were to commence simultaneously, on Hitler's orders. Bock showed little interest in the Hague operation and viewed the capture of the Dutch government as nothing more than a bonus. He preferred the seizure of the Moerdijk bridges to breach Fortress Holland. Kesselring promised his air fleet would prevent the French Army advancing from Antwerp and intervening.

The Battle of the Netherlands commenced on 10 May 1940. Kesselring's air operation was successful against the small Belgian Aviation Militaire, which was rendered ineffective, and Royal Netherlands Air Force, though the Dutch harassed the Luftwaffe until their surrender. The paratroopers, while initially successful, ran into fierce opposition in the Battle for The Hague, and the Battle of Rotterdam. The Luftwaffe lost 54 per cent of the transport aircraft committed; 125 destroyed, 53 bogged down, and 47 severely damaged. Some 4,000 paratroops (1,200 prisoners) became casualties.

On 14 May 1940, responding to a call for assistance from Student and demands for the bombing of the city by Georg von Küchler, commanding the 18th Army, Kesselring ordered the bombing of Rotterdam city centre. Fires raged out of control, destroying much of the city. An estimated 800 civilians were killed and 78,000 made homeless.

Wartime Allied newspapers predicted that Kesselring "will go down in history as the man who directed the bombing of the helpless Dutch city of Rotterdam, and slaughtered thousands of civilians." Under the Hague Convention of 1907, bombardment itself was not forbidden since Rotterdam was not an undefended city, but other aspects of the bombardment may have violated the laws of war. Historians are divided as to whether the bombing was an act of terror or served a tactical purpose.

After the surrender of the Netherlands on 14 May 1940, Luftflotte 2 attempted to move forward to new airfields in Belgium while still providing support for the fast-moving ground troops. The Battle of France was going well, with General der Panzertruppe Heinz Guderian forcing a crossing of the River Meuse at Sedan on 13 May 1940. To support the breakthrough, Generalleutnant Wolfram von Richthofen's [[8th Air Corps (Germany)|Fliegerkorps VIII]] was transferred to Luftflotte 3. By 24 May, the Allied forces had been cut in two, and the German Army was only 15 kilometres (9.3 mi) from Dunkirk, the last port on the English Channel available to the cut-off Allied forces. However, that day Rundstedt ordered a halt.

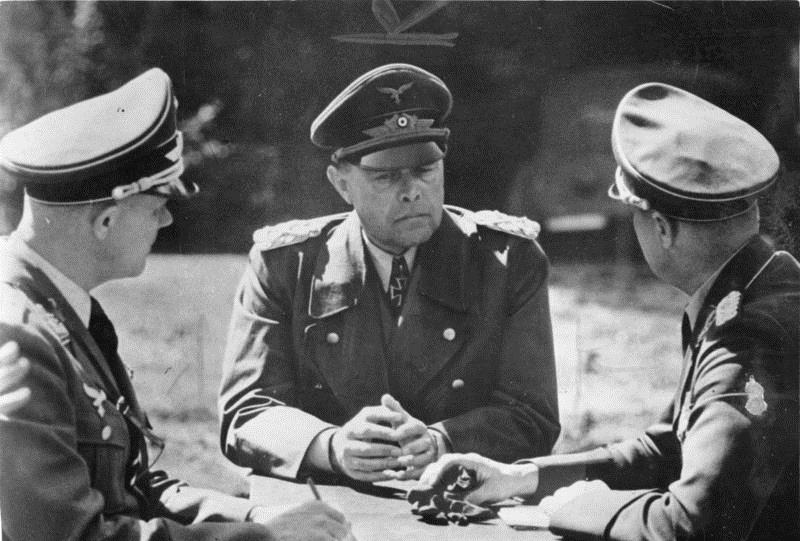
Kesselring in 1940

Göring promised the encircled enemy could be destroyed by aerial bombardment. Kesselring and Richthofen protested. They argued their commands had suffered heavy losses in two weeks of incessant fighting and the fighter and dive-bombers would be forced to operate at their maximum range. Neither man was confident of gaining air superiority. The protests were disregarded. It left the burden of preventing the Allied evacuation of Dunkirk to Kesselring's air fleet. Hampered by poor flying weather and staunch opposition from the Royal Air Force (RAF), the German operation failed.

Kesselring and his air commanders turned their attention to the final phase of the battle for France; Case Red. On 3 June, in a prelude to Red, the Luftwaffe conducted Operation Paula, a strategic air offensive against factories and airfields in and around Paris. Though German losses were minimal, the results were disappointing. The Luftwaffe high command (Oberkommando der Luftwaffe) (OKL) wrongly perceived the operation a success. The campaign proceeded rapidly; the Luftwaffe gained air superiority and held it. Kesselring's air fleet spent June attempting to prevent a second evacuation. Kesselring's bombers ranged further afield and contributed to Fliegerdivision 9's (Flying Division 9) minelaying operations in the English Channel and Bay of Biscay—one of his bomber wings attacked shipping an hour after the armistice came into effect.

For his role in the campaign in the west, Kesselring was promoted to Generalfeldmarschall (field marshal) during the 1940 Field Marshal Ceremony.

=== Battle of Britain ===
Following the campaign in France, Kesselring's Luftflotte 2 was committed to the Battle of Britain. Luftflotte 2's headquarters was located in Brussels. Kesselring's air fleet was numerically the strongest in the Luftwaffe in mid–1940. He controlled formations in the Netherlands, Belgium, and France north of the Seine. Kesselring was initially responsible for the bombing of southeastern England and the London area, but as the battle progressed, command responsibility shifted, with Generalfeldmarschall Hugo Sperrle's Luftflotte 3 assuming responsibility for the night-time "blitz" attacks while Luftflotte 2 conducted the main daylight operations.

Kesselring was sceptical about attacking Britain. He advocated capturing Gibraltar (Operation Felix), encouraging the British Government to negotiate, and then turning against London if necessary. Sperrle favoured attacking ports and shipping. Göring overruled them because he was sure the RAF Fighter Command was weak and could be defeated quickly. The Luftwaffe air fleet commanders did not collaborate with each other to devise an air superiority plan, much less conduct inter-service conferences with the army and navy to develop a joint strategy. Kesselring, in particular, did not understand how the RAF fighter defences worked, and even after the war held the naïve assumption Fighter Command could simply have been destroyed in dogfights.

The first phase of the battle—the Kanalkampf (Channel Battles) was marginally successful. Operation Eagle and the 18 August battles failed to break British air defences. The German attacks on RAF airfields reached a peak in the first week of September 1940. On the third day, Göring met with Sperrle and Kesselring. Göring was convinced Fighter Command was exhausted and favoured attacking London to draw out the last of the British fighter reserves. Kesselring enthusiastically agreed; Sperrle did not. Kesselring urged Göring to carry out an all-out attack, based on the unproven assertion that Fighter Command had been virtually destroyed. Sperrle dismissed Kesselring's optimism and put British strength at the more accurate figure of 1,000 fighters. Nevertheless, Kesselring's perception prevailed. The disagreement between the two air fleet commanders was not uncommon, and although they rarely quarrelled, their commands were separate and they did not coordinate their efforts. Instead, they fought separate campaigns.

The focus of air operations changed to destroying the docks and factories in the centre of London. The change in strategy has been described as militarily controversial. The decision certainly relieved the pressure on Fighter Command, but wartime records and post-war analysis have shown that Fighter Command was not on the verge of collapse as assumed by German intelligence.

On 7 September Kesselring's air fleet was still the largest in the Luftwaffe. At his command were 1,311 aircraft from an operational German total of 1,895. Eight days later his air fleet alone carried out a daylight air attack on London which is considered the climax of the battle. In staging a two-pronged, predictable set-piece attack, he played into Fighter Command's hands. As one analyst wrote, Kesselring was "back where he started" before the battle. The consequences for Luftwaffe airmen were severe on 15 September 1940. German aviators met a prepared enemy and lost 5.5 per cent of the committed force. In the afternoon loss rates of German bomber crews reached 18 per cent of the force sent out. German crew losses were seven times that of the British. Furthermore, Fighter Command did not commit its reserve during the main attacks as the German command predicted.

Luftflotte 2 continued The Blitz on British cities until May 1941. The zone of operations extended on a line from Selsey Bill, to Oxford, Birmingham–Manchester and Carlisle. Everything west of that line was Sperrle's responsibility. On 20 October, the OKL ordered Sperrle to take on most of the burden of night operations. Kesselring was instructed to concentrate on ports in Eastern England and carry out at least 50 airstrikes in London per night. The air fleet deployed single-engine aircraft, including dive-bombers, nicknamed "Leichte Kesselringe" (light Kesselrings) in hit-and-run raids. These tactics became a feature of the later phases of the Blitz.

The air fleet played a large role in the Birmingham and Coventry Blitz, with support from Luftflotte 3, which provided 304 of the 448 bombers in the attack. Surviving German records suggest that the aim of the Coventry raid was to disrupt production and reconstruction critical to the automotive industry, but also to dehouse workers. In the area of operations of Luftflotte 2 were two other armament hubs—both the port of Hull and industrial city of Sheffield were heavily bombed by units under the air fleet's command. (Note: For example, KG 1, KG 2, KG 77, KGr 126 flew against Sheffield on the night of 12/13 December; it was the main target of the night's operations. All of them were under Kesselring's command.) Many of the fleet's units were involved in the attack known as the Second Great Fire of London, on 29/30 December 1940. (Note: KG 1 and KG 2 flew in full strength. Both bomber wings were under Kesselring's command.)

=== Invasion of the Soviet Union ===
Results will demonstrate an officer's fitness to be a field marshal, and no one will then ask about his origins, whether he came from the army or the air force. But one piece of advice I will give to all air field marshals: do not become a one-sided technician, but learn to think and lead in terms of all three services.

— Albert Kesselring

Although earmarked for operations against the Soviet Union, Luftflotte 2 remained in the west until May 1941. The maintenance of pressure on British cities was a deception measure to mask the eastward deployment of the Luftwaffe. German airfield construction had also fallen behind schedule and they could not host combat units until May, although they were ready for the commencement of Operation Barbarossa on 22 June 1941. Kesselring arranged with Göring for Luftflotte 2 to be allocated additional transport to allow it to keep up with fast-moving armoured columns. The failure of German logistics left only 15 per cent of the Luftwaffe's 100,000 vehicles operational by the end of 1941.

Luftflotte 2 operated in support of Army Group Centre, commanded by Bock, continuing the close working relationship between the two. Kesselring's mission was to gain air superiority, and if possible air supremacy, as soon as possible while still supporting ground operations. For this, he had a fleet of 1,223 aircraft, which made up half of the Luftwaffe's commitment. Kesselring later remarked he "instructed my air force and flak generals to consider the wishes of the Army as my orders."

The German attack caught large numbers of Soviet Air Force aircraft on the ground. Faulty tactics—sending unescorted bombers against the Germans at regular intervals in tactically unsound formations—accounted for many more. Kesselring reported that in the first week of operations Luftflotte 2 had accounted for 2,500 Soviet aircraft in the air and on the ground. Even Göring found these figures hard to believe and ordered them to be checked. As the ground troops advanced, the figures could be directly confirmed and were found to be too low. Kesselring wrote that within days, he was able to fly over the front in his Focke-Wulf Fw 189 reconnaissance aircraft to observe the terrain and advance.

With air supremacy attained, Luftflotte 2 concentrated on ground operations, particularly guarding the flanks of the armoured spearheads, without which the rapid advance was not possible. When enemy counterattacks threatened, Kesselring threw the full weight of his force against them. Now that the Army was convinced of the value of air support, units were all too inclined to call for it. Kesselring now had to convince the Army that air support should be concentrated at critical points. He strove to improve army–air cooperation with new tactics and the appointment of Oberst Martin Fiebig as a special close air support commander.

By 26 July, Kesselring had reported the destruction of 165 tanks, 2,136 vehicles and 194 artillery pieces. His fleet also claimed 915 aircraft destroyed (823 on the ground) and 60 locomotives in 1,574 sorties. Kesselring's air fleet provided support in the battle of Białystok–Minsk and Smolensk. Minsk was devastated by German air raids. A sudden transfer of his air power north to Luftflotte 1, bad weather, and the resurgence of the Red Air Force in his sector, led to the defeat at Yelna in September. The cost of the successful encirclement battles was severe. In a thirteen-day period during the battle for Smolensk, from 6–19 July, Kesselring's air fleet lost 447 aircraft.

In late 1941, Luftflotte 2 supported the final German offensive against Moscow, Operation Typhoon. Raids on Moscow proved hazardous. Kesselring rated the opposition from both fighters and anti-aircraft guns. Kesselring began bombing raids on the capital on 21 July with four bomber wings numbering 195 aircraft—the largest during the period. Strategic bombing operations were intensive in October 1941, but diverted from the army support sphere, and dissipated the air effort. Militarily they had no effect and were considered prestige operations. Kesselring was uncharacteristically pessimistic about the results of the raids.

In the initial stages, Kesselring's air fleet carried out effective support operations. On 3 October, it claimed 679 vehicles were destroyed in 984 sorties, and 450 vehicles and 22 tanks the following day. The bad weather that hampered ground operations in Operation Typhoon from October on impeded air operations even more, but Luftflotte 2 continued to fly critical reconnaissance, interdiction, close-air support and aerial resupply missions. The intensity of attacks was evident in the number of combat operations flown: 690 on 7 October, and 537 on 10 October, and approximately 900 on 12 and 13 October. The 10 October missions resulted in claims of 450 vehicles and 150 artillery pieces destroyed. Over-confidence in victory caused the withdrawal of Kesselring's air fleet to the Mediterranean. The air corps belonging to Luftflotte 2 were sent to Germany or other sectors.

Between 22 June and 5 December 1941, the Luftwaffe lost 2,093 aircraft. Soviet sources give Red Air Force total aircraft losses as 21,200, of which at least 10,000 were destroyed in air combat. Despite the impressive statistics, on 5 December, the Red Army began a large-scale counter-offensive which ended the threat to Moscow and Barbarossa. The decision to remove Kesselring's air fleet in November irretrievably weakened German air power in the Soviet Union. The air supremacy Germany enjoyed in June and July 1941 dissipated due to the strain of maintaining a presence along a 2,000-mile (3,200 km) front. Increased commitments in other theatres prevented the Luftwaffe from fielding adequate reserves to sustain prolonged periods of close air support along the Eastern Front. The Red Air Force remained a viable threat which only heightened as the war continued.

=== Mediterranean and North Africa ===
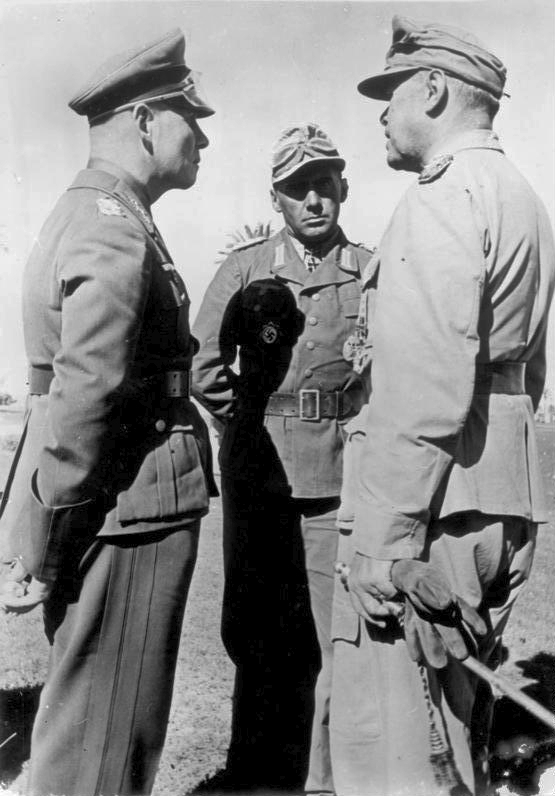
North Africa, February 1942. Kesselring (right) meets with Erwin Rommel (left) and Fritz Bayerlein of the Afrika Korps.

In November 1941, Kesselring was appointed Wehrmacht Commander-in-Chief South and was transferred to Italy along with his Luftflotte 2 staff, which for the time being also functioned as his Commander-in-Chief South staff. Only in January 1943 did he form his headquarters into a true theatre staff and create a separate staff to control Luftflotte 2. As a theatre commander, he was answerable directly to the Oberkommando der Wehrmacht (OKW) and commanded ground, naval and air forces, but this was of little importance at first as most German units in the theatre were under Italian operational control.

In 1941 it was clear whoever controlled Malta held an advantage. The island sat in the middle of the Mediterranean in the path of maritime trading routes—and Maltese–based British forces had taken a heavy toll of Axis shipping. Malta provided a base from which British aircraft and submarines could interdict Axis convoys headed for North Africa. Without the vital supplies they carried, particularly fuel, the Axis forces in North Africa could not conduct operations. In October 1941, 63 per cent of Axis supply ships had been sunk, and in November it was 77 per cent. Periodically, Kesselring established local air superiority and neutralised Malta. Kesselring ordered attacks on the island's airfields, ports and infrastructure, along with Malta Convoys, which provided food and war materials to the island.

Kesselring's Luftflotte 2 made an immediate impact. The offensive formally opened on 20 March 1942. One-third of the bombing effort was directed against airfields. Conflicting Axis priorities, insufficient forces, and concentration of force, coupled with British determination to reinforce and supply Malta, defeated Kesselring. After May 1942 the British air defences were not seriously threatened, and by August, the air battle over the island had subsided. Kesselring's air fleet flew 11,000 sorties against the island from early April to 10 May, placing the garrison and population in dire straits. Approximately 30,000 buildings were destroyed or damaged and 1,300 civilians were killed. The Allied losses in airmen, fighter aircraft, warships and transport ships were high. The effectiveness of the attacks brought the population to the brink of starvation. Axis shipping losses fell to 20–30 per cent.

Through suppressing Maltese–based forces, Kesselring managed to deliver an increased flow of supplies to Generaloberst Erwin Rommel's Afrika Korps in Libya. The Axis lost only three per cent of their seaborne supplies and the central Mediterranean was closed, once again, to Allied shipping. With his forces thus strengthened, Rommel prepared an attack on the British positions around Gazala, while Kesselring planned Operation Herkules, an airborne and seaborne attack on Malta with the Italian 185th Infantry Division "Folgore" and the German Ramcke Parachute Brigade. Kesselring hoped to thereby secure the Axis line of communication with North Africa.

For the Battle of Gazala, Rommel divided his command in two, taking personal command of the mobile units of the Afrika Korps and Italian XX Motorised Corps, which he led around the southern flank of Lieutenant-General Neil Ritchie's British Eighth Army. Rommel left the infantry of the Italian X and XXI Corps under General der Panzertruppe Ludwig Crüwell to hold the rest of the Eighth Army in place. This command arrangement went awry on 29 May 1942 when Crüwell was shot down and he was taken prisoner. Lacking an available commander of sufficient seniority, Kesselring assumed personal command of Gruppe Crüwell, placing himself under Rommel's command even though he was the senior officer. It was the first time Kesselring had held a senior ground command, albeit a temporary one. He was able to relieve Rommel's logistical problems by pushing a supply convoy through the British minefields.

Kesselring was critical of Rommel's performance in the Battle of Bir Hakeim, a vital position held by the 1st Free French Brigade that formed the southern pivot of the British Gazala Line. Rommel called for, and Kesselring provided, air support, but the infantry assaults failed to capture the position. Kesselring attributed this to faulty coordination between the ground and air attacks. The Luftwaffe lost 14 aircraft on 3 and 4 June, and Kesselring was concerned that the Army planned to have the Luftwaffe starve the position out. After a ground assault led by Rommel in person, and air strikes by 124 Stukas and 76 Junkers Ju 88s escorted by 170 Bf 109s, Bir Hakeim was evacuated by the Free French on 10 June. For Rommel's capture of Tobruk on 21 June, Kesselring brought in additional aircraft from Greece and Crete. In June over 260 German aircraft were in North Africa, and 7,035 sorties were flown. Over 33,000 prisoners were taken when Tobruk fell. For his part in the campaign, Kesselring was awarded the Knight's Cross with Oak Leaves and Swords, but he lost his one-rank advantage over his subordinates; Rommel was promoted to Generalfeldmarschall on 22 June, and Ugo Cavallero became a Marshal of Italy on 1 July, followed by Ettore Bastico on 12 August.

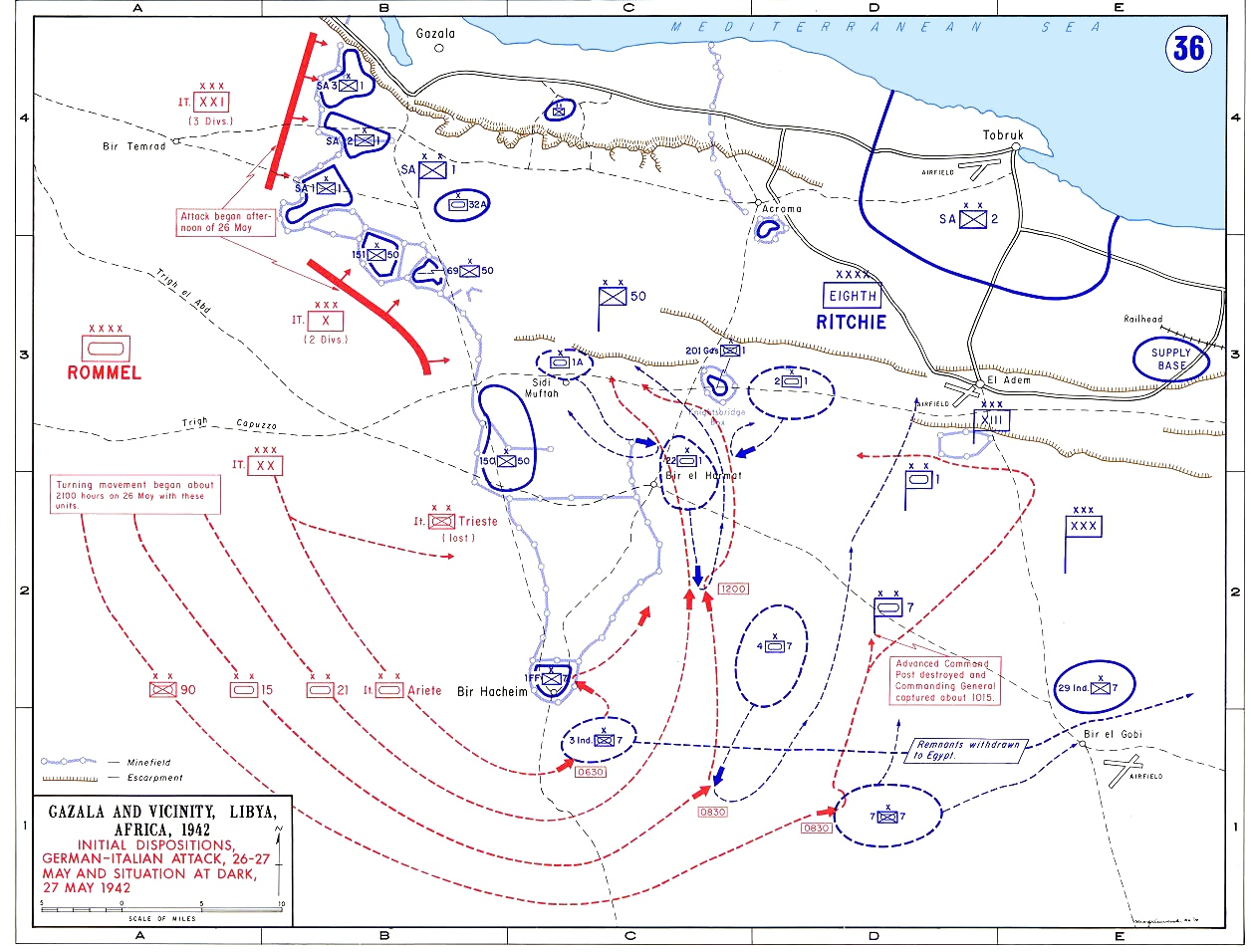
Battle of Gazala

In the wake of the victory at Tobruk, Rommel persuaded Hitler to authorise an attack on Egypt instead of Malta, over Italian and Kesselring's objections. Cavallero's diary and Generalmajor Friedrich von Mellenthin's account in Panzer Battles support this version of events, but on 24 June 1942 Bastico and Kesselring approved Rommel's request to pursue the British Eighth Army into Egypt. The Malta operation never had the wholehearted support of OKW, and historians remain doubtful that it would have been successful. The parachute troops assembled for Operation Herkules were sent to Rommel. The failure to eliminate Malta was a crucial blow to Axis ambitions in North Africa. Kesselring claimed he had recognised and pressed for the elimination of Malta by invasion, and blamed Rommel, the OKW and the Italians for the failure to act.

Things went well at first, with Rommel winning the Battle of Mersa Matruh. But as Kesselring and Italian commanders argued, the logistical difficulties mounted and the result was the disastrous fighting of the First Battle of El Alamein and Battle of Alam el Halfa. When Rommel arrived at Alamein he had only 6,500 men and 85 tanks–only 1,500 of the infantry and 55 of the tanks were German.

Kesselring supported Rommel's decision to withdraw. He considered Rommel to be a great general leading fast-moving troops at the corps level of command, but felt that he was too moody and changeable for higher command. For Kesselring, Rommel's nervous breakdown and hospitalisation for depression at the end of the North African campaign only confirmed this.

Kesselring was briefly considered as a possible successor to Generalfeldmarschall Wilhelm Keitel as Chief of Staff of the OKW in September 1942, with General der Panzertruppe Friedrich Paulus replacing Generaloberst Alfred Jodl as Chief of the Operations Staff at OKW. That Kesselring was considered for this appointment demonstrated the high regard in which Kesselring was held by Hitler. Nevertheless, Hitler decided that neither Kesselring nor Paulus could be spared from their current posts. In October 1942, Kesselring was given direct command of all German armed forces in the theatre except Rommel's German-Italian Panzer Army in North Africa, including General der Infanterie Enno von Rintelen, the German liaison officer at the Italian Comando Supremo. Kesselring's command also included the troops in Greece and the Balkans until the end of the year, when Hitler created another army group headquarters under Generalfeldmarschall Wilhelm List, naming him Wehrmacht Commander-in-Chief South East.

=== Tunisia ===
Operation Torch, the Allied invasion of French North Africa, precipitated a crisis in Kesselring's command. He ordered Generalleutnant Walther Nehring, the former commander of the Afrika Korps who was returning to action after recovering from wounds received at the Battle of Alam el Halfa, to proceed to Tunisia to take command of a new corps (LXXXX Corps). Kesselring ordered Nehring to establish a bridgehead in Tunisia and then to press west as far as possible so as to gain freedom to manoeuvre. By December, the Allied commander, General Dwight D. Eisenhower, was forced to concede that Kesselring had won the race; the final phase of Torch had failed and the Axis could only be ejected from Tunisia after a prolonged struggle.

With the initiative back with the Germans and Italians, Kesselring hoped to launch an offensive that would drive the Allies out of North Africa. At the Battle of the Kasserine Pass his forces gave the Allies a beating, but in the end, strong Allied resistance and a string of Axis errors stopped the advance. Kesselring now concentrated on shoring up his forces by moving the required tonnages of supplies from Italy but his efforts were frustrated by Allied aircraft and submarines. An Allied offensive in April finally broke through, leading to a collapse of the Axis position in Tunisia. Some 275,000 German and Italian troops were taken prisoner. In return, Kesselring had, however, held up the Allies in Tunisia for six months. The delay ended any prospect of an Allied invasion of Northern France in 1943, although it was not the only reason for its postponement to the middle of 1944.

The question of Tunisian Jews and their treatment by German forces has also been raised. According to one source, German forces exploited Tunisian Jews for slave labour, though no evidence has surfaced to suggest they were murdered in Africa.

By this time, Kesselring was derisively nicknamed "Smiling Albert" by the Allies, (Note: The nickname "Smiling Albert" was bestowed on Kesselring by the Allies. It is not used by German writers. It was used during the war. In 1941, newspapers referred to him as "the keep smiling general". By 1943, news sources were referring to him as "Smiling Albert".) but was known as "Uncle Albert" by his troops. He was one of the most popular generals of World War II with the German rank and file. His popularity was enhanced by frequent, often unannounced, visits to the front line. Hans von Luck wrote that Kesselring was respected because he was the only senior commander to visit the front in North Africa.

=== Italian campaign ===
==== Sicily ====
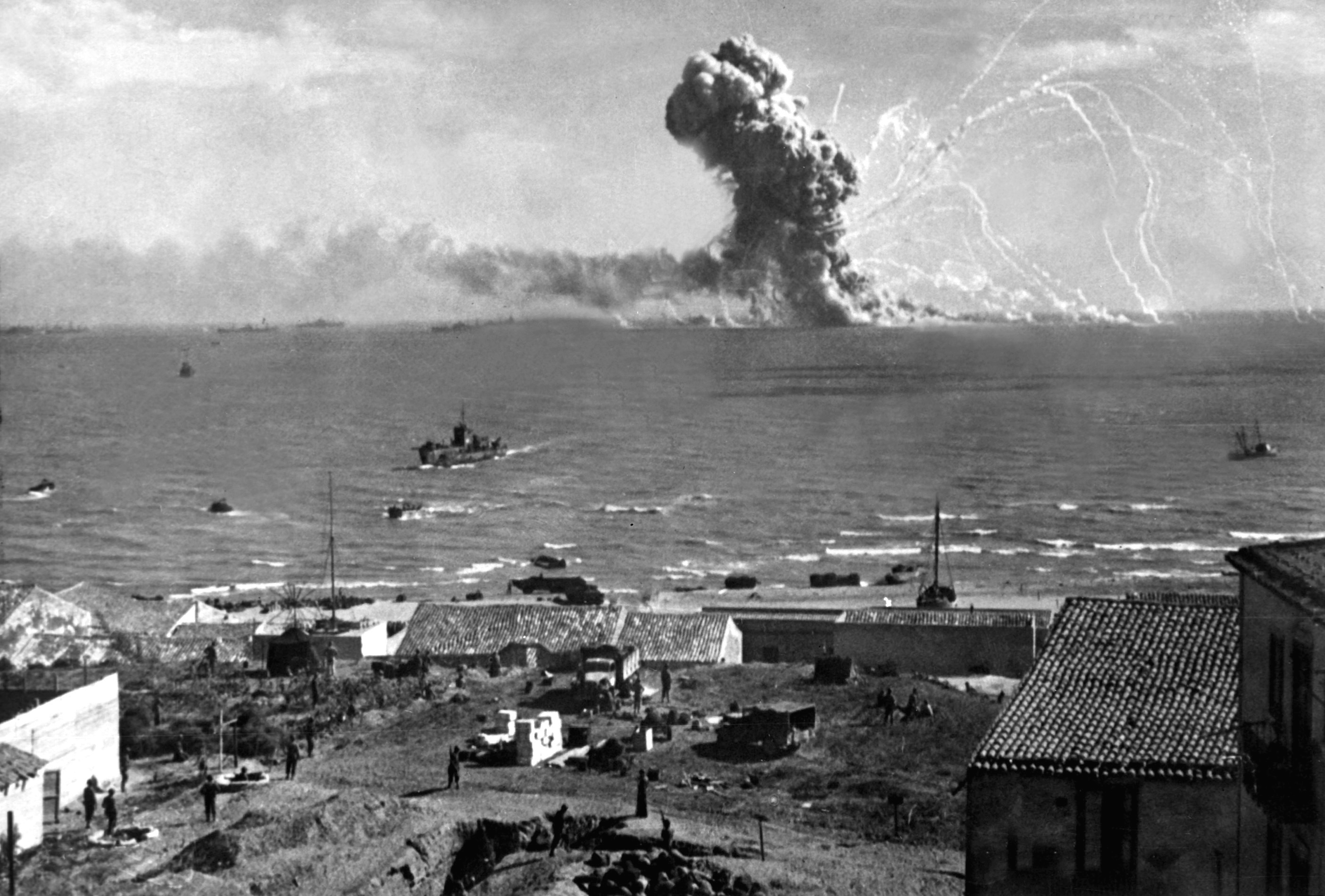
The Liberty ship SS Robert Rowan explodes spectacularly – but without loss of life – after being hit by a German bomber off Gela, Sicily, on 11 July 1943

Kesselring expected that the Allies would next invade Sicily, as a landing could be made there under fighter cover from Tunisia and Malta. He reinforced the six coastal and four mobile Italian divisions there with two mobile German divisions, the 15th Panzergrenadier Division and the Hermann Göring Panzer Division, both rebuilt after being destroyed in Tunisia. In his memoirs, Kesselring wrote that he was well aware that while this force was large enough to stop the Allies from simply marching in, it could not withstand a large-scale invasion. He therefore pinned his hopes on an immediate counterattack, which he ordered Oberst Paul Conrath of the Hermann Göring Panzer Division to carry out the moment the objective of the Allied invasion fleet was known, with or without orders from the island commander, Generale d'Armata Alfredo Guzzoni.

The Allied invasion of Sicily on 10 July 1943 was stubbornly opposed. Kesselring hoped that the Allied invasion fleet would provide good targets for U-boats, but they met with few successes. Pressure from the Allied air forces forced Luftflotte 2, commanded since June by Richthofen, to withdraw most of its aircraft to the mainland. Unaware that Guzzoni had already ordered a major counterattack on 11 July, Kesselring bypassed the chain of command to order the Hermann Göring Panzer Division to attack that day in the hope that a vigorous attack could succeed before the Americans could bring the bulk of their artillery and armoured support ashore. Although his troops gave the Americans "quite a battering", they failed to capture the Allied position.

According to Kesselring, he flew to Sicily himself on 12 July to survey the situation and decided that no more than a delaying action was possible and that the island would eventually have to be abandoned. Nonetheless, he intended to fight on, and he reinforced Sicily with the 1st Parachute Division and the 29th Panzergrenadier Division. Kesselring returned to Sicily on 16 July to confer with Guzzoni and the senior German commander, General der Panzertruppe Hans-Valentin Hube. Kesselring and Guzzoni still did not believe all was lost, and agreed not to evacuate Sicily, despite the danger of it being cut off by another Allied amphibious operation. Unable to provide much more in the way of air support, Kesselring gave Hube command of the heavy flak units on the island, although this was contrary to Luftwaffe doctrine. Generalmajor Fridolin von Senger und Etterlin later wrote that he thought that Kesselring was pursuing an "eye-catching defensive success" after the disaster in Tunisia.

Kesselring managed to delay the Allies in Sicily for another month; the Allied conquest of Sicily was not complete until 17 August. His evacuation of Sicily, which began a week earlier on 10 August, was perhaps the most brilliant action of the campaign. In spite of the Allies' superiority on land, at sea, and in the air, Kesselring was able to evacuate not only 40,000 men, but also 9,605 vehicles, 94 guns, 47 tanks, 1,100 tons of ammunition, 970 tons of fuel, and 15,000 tons of stores. He was able to achieve near-perfect coordination among the three services under his command while his opponent, Eisenhower, could not.

==== Allied invasion of Italy ====
With the fall of Sicily, OKW feared that Italy would withdraw from the war, but Kesselring remained confident that the Italians would continue to fight. OKW regarded Kesselring and Rintelen as too pro-Italian and began to bypass them, sending Rommel to northern Italy, and Student to Rome, where his I Parachute Corps was under OKW orders to occupy the capital in case of Italian defection. Benito Mussolini was removed from power on 25 July 1943, and Rommel and OKW began to plan for the occupation of Italy and the disarmament of the Italian Army. Kesselring was not informed of these plans for the time being. Kesselring claimed in his memoirs that Hitler's assessment was that "Kesselring is too honest for those born traitors down there".

On the advice of Rommel and Jodl, Hitler decided that the Italian Peninsula could not be held without the assistance of the Italian Army. The plan was not to give up the whole of Italy and retreat to the Alps, but to hold the Po Valley. Kesselring was ordered to withdraw from southern Italy and consolidate his forces with Rommel's Army Group B in Northern Italy, where Rommel would assume overall command. Kesselring was slated to be posted to Norway.

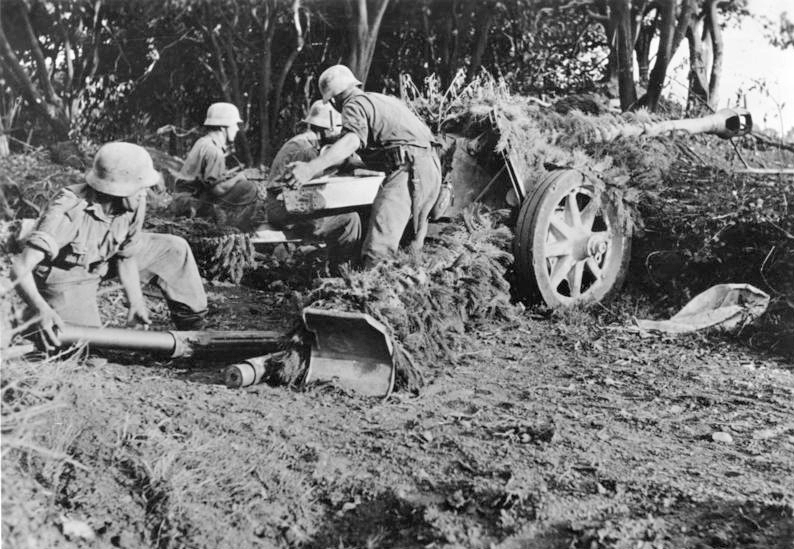
A German anti-tank gun near Salerno

For his part, Kesselring was convinced that all was well, that the Italians would continue to fight, and that there was no threat to his troops or his communications. He was appalled at the prospect of abandoning Italy, which he felt was completely unnecessary, as he was certain that Italy south of the northern Apennine Mountains could be held for six to nine months. This assessment was based on his belief that the Allies would not conduct operations outside the range of their air cover, which could only reach as far as Salerno. Kesselring submitted his resignation on 14 August 1943, but SS-Obergruppenführer Karl Wolff, the Supreme SS and Police Leader in Italy, intervened on Kesselring's behalf with Hitler. Wolff painted Rommel as "politically unreliable", and argued that Kesselring's presence in southern Italy was vital to prevent an early Italian defection. On Wolff's advice, Hitler refused to accept Kesselring's resignation.

Italy withdrew from the war on 8 September, and the Germans executed Operation Achse, in which they disarmed Italian units. How Operation Achse played out depended on the location and the ratio of German to Italian forces, and the attitude of Italian division commanders. Kesselring immediately moved to secure Rome. He ordered the 3rd Panzergrenadier Division and 2nd Parachute Division to close on the city, while a detachment made an unsuccessful attempt to seize the Italian Army staff at Monterotondo in a coup de main operation. Kesselring's two divisions were faced by five Italian divisions, including the Ariete and Centauro armoured divisions, but using bluff, negotiation, appeals to brothers in arms from the fighting in North Africa, and occasionally brute force, he managed to overcome the opposition, disperse the Italian forces and secure the city in two days.

Mussolini was rescued by the Germans in Unternehmen Eiche, a raid planned by Student and carried out by SS-Obersturmbannführer Otto Skorzeny on 12 September, the details of which were deliberately, though unsuccessfully, kept from Kesselring, according to his memoirs. Rommel deported Italian soldiers, except for those willing to serve in German units, to Germany for forced labour, whereas Italian units in Kesselring's area were initially disbanded and their men permitted to go home. A massacre outside his command would nonetheless have consequences for Kesselring. Foreign ministers from the United States, the United Kingdom and the Soviet Union were meeting in Moscow when they received the news that 100 Italian officers had been killed in the aftermath of the Battle of Kos. Appalled, they then issued the Moscow Declaration on 31 October 1943, which laid out the criteria for the punishment of crimes committed by Germany and its allies.

Italy now effectively became an occupied country, as the Germans poured in troops, although neither side accorded it that status. (Note: Two parts of Italy were annexed by Germany: South Tyrol and the area around Trieste.) The Allies accorded Italy the status of "co-belligerent" rather than that of an ally, which meant that Italians could still be tried for war crimes. According to his memoirs, Kesselring blamed the Allies for the tragedy that unfolded in Italy. He felt that Hitler would have been willing to allow Italy to withdraw from the war had the Allies agreed to respect its neutrality and not use it as a base for operations against Germany.

==== Salerno ====
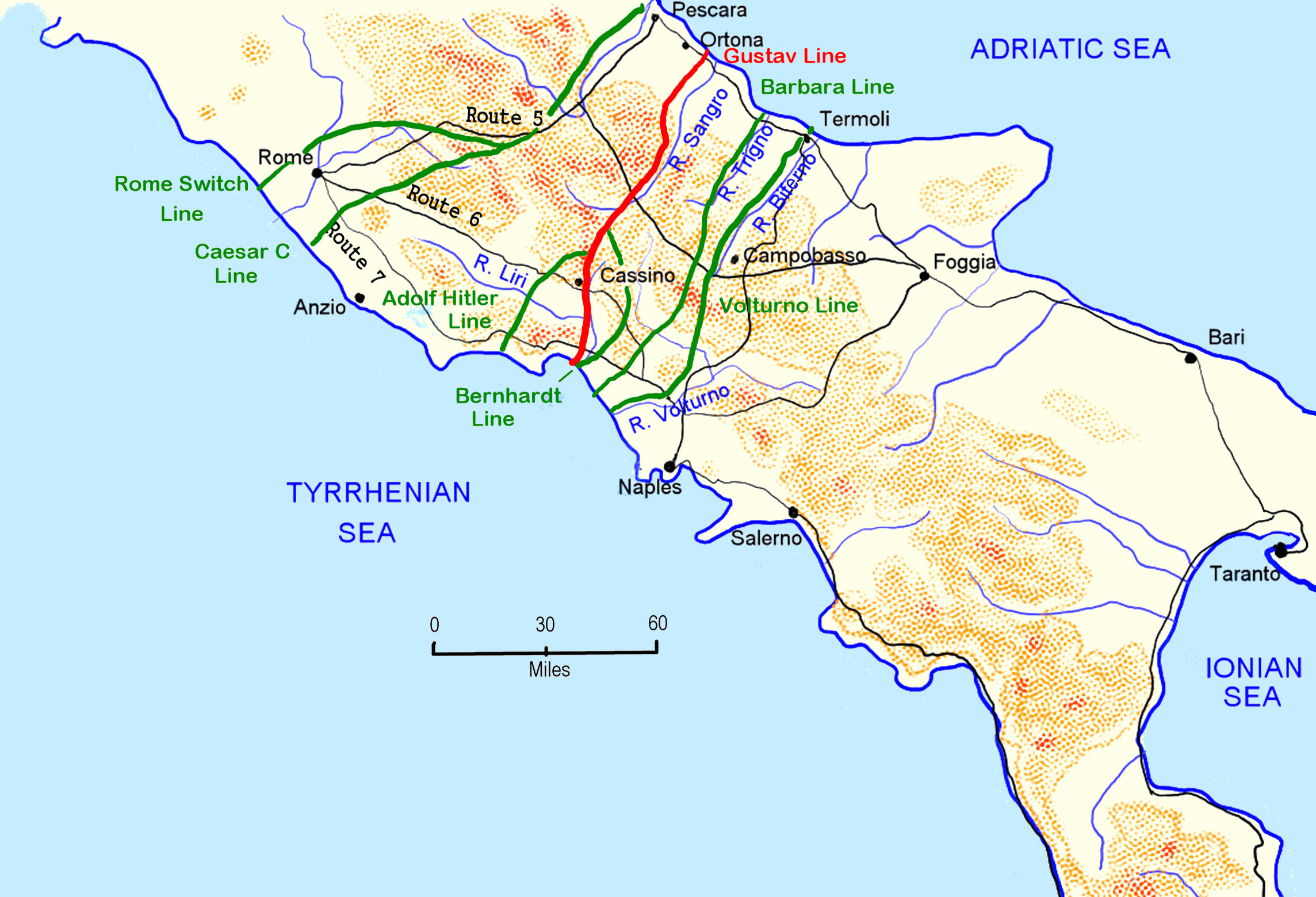
German defensive lines south of Rome.

Kesselring claimed in his memoirs that his command was already "written off", but he intended to fight. Eisenhower had excellent intelligence through Ultra, the decryption of German Enigma machine signals and Japanese Purple diplomatic messages, and from the Italians themselves, and was aware of the German plans to withdraw from southern Italy. He therefore adopted a risky strategy of making a series of landings in Italy rather than concentrating his forces. Kesselring inadvertently misled him better than the best deception plan could have.

At the Battle of Salerno in September 1943, Kesselring launched a full-scale counterattack against the US Fifth Army landings there with Generaloberst Heinrich von Vietinghoff's Tenth Army. The counterattack inflicted heavy casualties on the Allies, forced them back in several areas, and, for a time, made Allied commanders contemplate evacuation. The short distance from German airfields allowed Luftflotte 2 to put 120 aircraft over the Salerno area on 11 September 1943. The German offensive ultimately failed to throw the Allies back into the sea because of the intervention of Allied naval gunfire which decimated the advancing German units, stubborn Allied resistance and the advance of the British Eighth Army. On 17 September 1943, Kesselring gave Vietinghoff permission to break off the attack and withdraw.

Kesselring had been defeated but he had also gained precious time. Already, in defiance of his orders, he was preparing a series of successive fallback positions on the Volturno Line, the Barbara Line and the Bernhardt Line. The port of Naples was therefore denied to the Allies until October. The Apennine Mountains run along the centre of the Italian Peninsula, and therefore the rivers and gorges radiate down to the sea on both coasts. The mountains gave the Germans good observation, and allowed them to conduct a classic reverse slope defence, with the forward slopes thinly manned, but covered by machine guns with interlocking fields of fire, minefields, and in some cases deliberately flooded valleys. Allied artillery was reduced in effectiveness due to the poor observation of well-concealed German positions, and the need to fire at high angles to clear the mountain tops. The onset of wet autumn weather and inadequate road network also favoured the defence. Low cloud cover hampered observation from the air, and muddy roads slowed the delivery of ammunition and supplies to forward areas.

Only in November 1943, after a month of hard fighting, did the Allies reach Kesselring's main position, the Gustav Line. This was the narrowest part of the peninsula. Kesselring estimated that it could be held with just eleven divisions, with a couple of mobile divisions in reserve to guard against an Allied amphibious landing, whereas the position in the Northern Apennines would require up to twenty divisions. Kesselring accepted the risk of being outflanked by an amphibious landing, which he believed would be Eisenhower's best move. He was not aware that the necessary amphibious lift had been sent to the Indian Ocean for Operation Buccaneer, a landing in southern Burma, which was eventually cancelled. According to his memoirs, Kesselring felt that even more could have been accomplished if he had been given access to the troops held "uselessly" under Rommel's command.

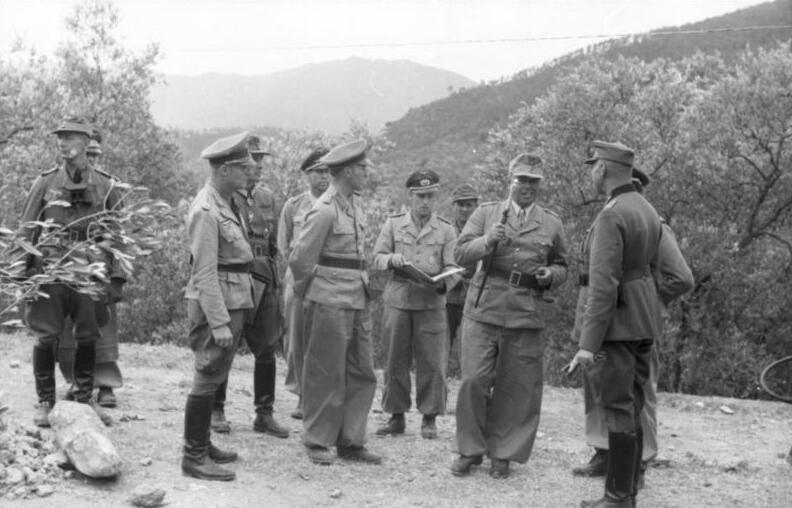
Kesselring (with field marshal baton) in Italy in 1944

In November 1943, Kesselring met with Hitler. Kesselring gave an optimistic assessment of the situation in Italy and gave reassurances that he could hold the Allies south of Rome on the Gustav Line. Kesselring further promised that he could prevent the Allies from reaching the Northern Apennines for at least six months. As a result, on 6 November 1943, Hitler ordered Rommel and his Army Group B headquarters to move to France to take charge of the Atlantic Wall and prepare for the Allied attack that was expected there in the spring of 1944. On 21 November 1943, Kesselring resumed command of all German forces in Italy, combining Commander-in-Chief South, a joint command, with that of Army Group C, a ground command. "I had always blamed Kesselring", Hitler told a conference in August 1944, "for looking at things too optimistically ... events have proved Rommel wrong, and I have been justified in my decision to leave Field Marshal Kesselring there, whom I have seen as an incredible political idealist, but also as a military optimist, and it is my opinion that military leadership without optimism is not possible." (Note: Hitler's opinion of Rommel may have declined after the 20 July 1944 bomb plot.)

The Luftwaffe scored a notable success on the night of 2 December 1943 when 105 Junkers Ju 88s struck the port of Bari. Skilfully using chaff to confuse the Allied radar operators, they found the port packed with brightly lit Allied shipping. The result was the most destructive air raid on Allied shipping since the attack on Pearl Harbor in December 1941. Hits were scored on two ammunition ships and a tanker. Burning oil and exploding ammunition spread over the harbour. Some 16 ships were sunk and eight damaged, and the port was put out of action for three weeks. Moreover, one of the ships sunk, SS John Harvey, had been carrying mustard gas, which enveloped the port in a cloud of poisonous vapours.

==== Cassino and Anzio ====
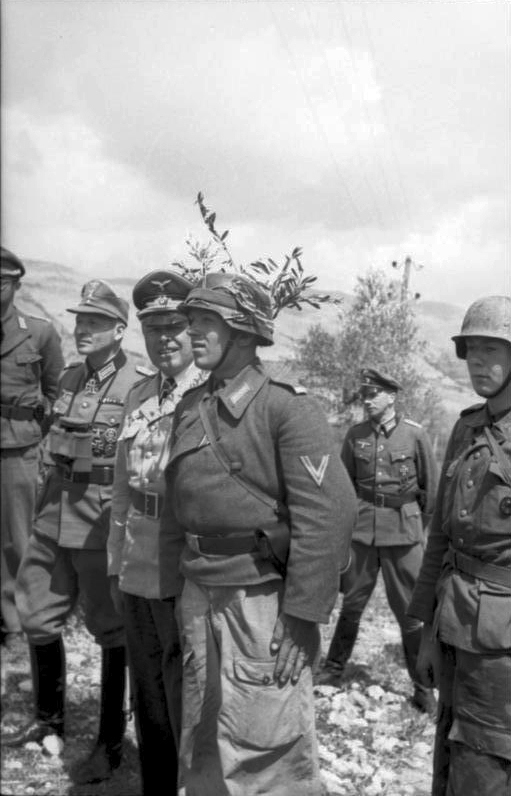
Kesselring inspects the front near Monte Cassino in April 1944. He attempted to maintain contact with the front-line troops with frequent inspection tours.

The first Allied attempt to break through the Gustav Line in the Battle of Monte Cassino in January 1944 met with early success, with the British X Corps breaking through the line held by the 94th Infantry Division and imperilling the entire Tenth Army. Kesselring rushed his reserves, the 29th and 90th Panzergrenadier Divisions, to the Cassino front. They were able to stabilise the German position there but left Rome poorly guarded.

Kesselring wrote in his memoirs that he felt that he had been out-generalled when the Allies landed at Anzio. A few days before, he had told Jodl that he did not consider a mid-winter Allied amphibious operation likely. Admiral Wilhelm Canaris, the chief of the Abwehr, the German military intelligence service, advised that it was out of the question for four to six weeks. Although taken by surprise, Kesselring moved rapidly to regain control of the situation, summoning Generaloberst Eberhard von Mackensen's Fourteenth Army headquarters and the 65th and 362nd Divisions from northern Italy, the 29th and 90th Panzergrenadier Divisions from the Cassino front, and the 26th Panzer Division from Tenth Army. OKW contributed some troops from other theatres, and by February Kesselring was able to take the offensive at Anzio. His forces were unable to crush the Allied beachhead, and in his memoirs, Kesselring blamed himself, OKW and Mackensen for avoidable errors.

Meanwhile, costly fighting at Monte Cassino in February 1944, brought the Allies close to a breakthrough into the Liri Valley. To hold the bastion of Monte Cassino, Kesselring brought in the 1st Parachute Division, an "exceptionally well trained and conditioned" formation, on 26 February. Despite heavy casualties and the expenditure of enormous quantities of ammunition, an Allied offensive in March 1944 failed to break the Gustav Line position.

One disadvantage of the geography of the Italian peninsula that otherwise favoured the defence was that it constricted the German line of communication. The Allies took advantage of this with Operation Strangle, an intensive air interdiction campaign. Through Ultra they knew precisely how much tonnage was needed to support the Tenth Army at Cassino and the Fourteenth Army at Anzio. Between 15 March and 10 May 1944, US Lieutenant General Ira Eaker's Mediterranean Allied Air Forces flew 21,688 interdiction sorties, during which it dropped 25,375 short tons (23,020 t) of bombs. This left Army Group C critically short of fuel and ammunition. (Note: Between June 1940 and April 1945, 59,796 Italian civilians and 4,558 Italian servicemen died in Allied air raids.)

On 11 May 1944 General Sir Harold Alexander, commanding the Allied Armies in Italy, launched Operation Diadem, which finally broke through the Gustav Line and forced the Tenth Army to withdraw. Due to fuel and transportation shortages, units had to be moved piecemeal. Kesselring appealed to the Kriegsmarine to move more supplies by sea and urged his corps and division commanders to conserve ammunition. In the process, a gap opened up between the Tenth and Fourteenth Armies, threatening both with encirclement. For this failure, Kesselring relieved Mackensen of his command, replacing him with General der Panzertruppe Joachim Lemelsen.

Fortunately for the Germans, Lieutenant General Mark W. Clark, commander of the U.S. Fifth Army, obsessed with the capture of Rome, failed to take advantage of the situation. Kesselring diverted troops to oppose Clark's attack, and the result was three days of bloody and fruitless American assaults, while the gap between the Tenth and Fourteenth Armies was poorly defended. In the end, it was an advance in this sector that opened the gate to Rome, and the Tenth Army was able to link up with the Fourteenth Army, and conduct a fighting withdrawal to the next line of defence, the Trasimene Line. Whether Clark would have been able to trap Kesselring had he tried still remains an open question. Robert Citino noted that: "Slithering out of a trap by the skin of their teeth was just another day at the office for German commanders by 1944. In Italy, facing two Allied armies coming on from opposite directions, the Wehrmacht did it again, surviving yet another near-death experience and living to fight another day."

For his part in the campaign, Kesselring was awarded the Knight's Cross with Oak Leaves, Swords and Diamonds by Hitler at the Wolfsschanze near Rastenburg, East Prussia on 19 July 1944. The next day, Hitler was the target of the 20 July plot. Informed of this event that evening by Göring, Kesselring, like many other senior commanders, sent a telegram to Hitler reaffirming his loyalty.

==== Actions affecting population and cultural objects ====
Kesselring, during the campaign, as far as he was able, attempted to avoid the destruction of many artistically important Italian cities, including Rome, Florence, Siena and Orvieto. In some cases, historic bridges—such as the Ponte Vecchio—were booby trapped rather than blown up. However, other historic Florentine bridges were destroyed on his orders and, in addition to booby trapping the old bridge, he ordered the demolition of the ancient historical central borough at its two ends, in order to delay the Allied advance across the River Arno.

Kesselring supported the Italian declaration of Rome as an open city on 14 August 1943, after Rome was bombed for the first time on 19 July with over 700 civilian deaths. The unilateral declaration was never accepted by the Allies as the city remained centres of government and industry, and while the Americans supported accepting the open city status of Rome, the British remained implacably opposed. The replacement of the American Eisenhower with the British General Sir Henry Maitland Wilson as theatre commander loosened restrictions at that level. As a result, Rome was bombed by the Allies many times.

For Kesselring, the open city status held many advantages, as it promised a means of quelling unrest in Rome and scored a propaganda triumph. Moreover, as Operation Strangle took its toll, trains ceased to move through Rome and German vehicle convoys routinely bypassed the city. Kesselring later wrote that when the fighting drew close to Rome in May 1944, there were considerable tactical advantages to be had from defending the Tiber bridges, but the German ambassador to the Vatican, Ernst von Weizsäcker, urged Kesselring not to do so, and Kesselring withdrew from Rome without mounting a defence there, saving the city. After the Allies occupied Rome, the open city declaration was disregarded, and they made full use of Rome for military purposes.

Kesselring tried to preserve the monastery of Monte Cassino by avoiding its military occupation even though it offered superb observation over the battlefield. Ultimately this was unsuccessful, as the Allies believed the monastery would be used to direct the German artillery against their lines. On the morning of 15 February 1944, 142 Boeing B-17 Flying Fortress, 47 North American B-25 Mitchell and 40 Martin B-26 Marauder medium bombers deliberately dropped 1,150 tons of high explosives and incendiary bombs on the abbey, reducing the historic monastery to a smoking mass of rubble. Kesselring was aware that some artworks taken from Monte Cassino for safekeeping wound up in the possession of Hermann Göring. Kesselring had some German soldiers shot for looting. German authorities avoided giving the Italians control over artworks because they feared that "entire collections would be sold to Switzerland". A 1945 Allied investigation reported that Italian cultural treasures had suffered relatively little war damage. Kesselring received regular updates on efforts to preserve cultural treasures and his personal interest in the matter contributed to the high proportion of art treasures that were saved.

==== War crimes ====
By 24 September 1943, Herbert Kappler, the German police attaché who represented the Sicherheitsdienst (SD) in Rome, had learned that Heinrich Himmler wanted him to round up and deport the Jews of Rome. Kappler was concerned about a rise of anti-German sentiment among the Italian population. The German consul in Rome and then senior embassy diplomat, Eitel Friedrich Möllhausen, also learned of the order. According to writer Robert Katz, who interviewed Möllhausen in 1968, Kappler suggested that they go to Kesselring to recommend that the Jews should be used for forced labour on fortifications in Rome (as he had done with those in Tunisia). If Kesselring would agree to that solution, Kappler would consider his orders to be countermanded. In his memoirs of 1948 Möllhausen recounts that he and Kappler met with Kesselring within an hour. Upon hearing how many men Kappler would need for the roundup, Kesselring declared that he could not spare a single man, and approved of the idea of using Jewish labour.

On 9 October Möllhausen was advised that the Roman Jews were to be deported and that he was not to interfere in any way. On 16 October 1,259 Jews were rounded up in Rome, and 1,007 of them were sent to Auschwitz. Upon arrival all but 196 were immediately gassed. Only 15 survived the war. Some 6,806 Jews were arrested and deported during the German occupation of Italy, of whom 5,969 died in Nazi concentration camps. Historian Andrew Sangster argues that while Kesselring never played an active role in The Holocaust, he must have known of these crimes and his guilt lies "in his unquestioning support of Hitler who had made the Holocaust a priority."

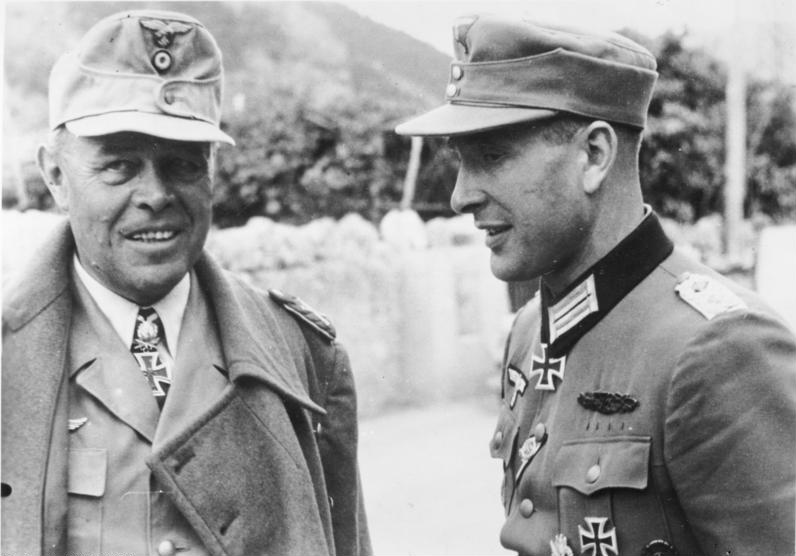
Kesselring with Oberst Ferdinand Hippel

On 22–23 March 1944, a 15-man American Office of Strategic Services (OSS) Operational Group landed in inflatable boats from US Navy PT boats on the Ligurian coast as part of Operation Ginny II, a mission to blow up the entrances of two vital railway tunnels. Their boats were discovered and they were captured by a smaller group of Italian and German soldiers. On 26 March, they were executed under Hitler's "Commando Order", issued after German soldiers had been bound and shot by commandos during the Dieppe Raid and the Raid on Sark. Kesselring was in Liguria in 23 and 24 March, where he inspected the harbour defences.

In Rome on 23 March 1944, 33 policemen of the Police Regiment Bozen from the German-speaking population of the Italian province of South Tyrol and three Italian civilians were killed by a bomb blast and the subsequent shooting. (Note: Although sometimes described as an SS unit, Polizeiregiment Bozen was not incorporated into the SS until a month after the 23 March 1944 bombing.) In response, Hitler approved the recommendation of Mackensen, who was responsible for the sector including Rome, that ten Italians should be shot for each policeman killed. The task fell to SS Obersturmbannführer Herbert Kappler who, finding there were not enough condemned prisoners available, made up the numbers using Jewish prisoners and civilians taken from the streets. The result was the Ardeatine massacre.

The fall of Rome on 4 June 1944 placed Kesselring in a dangerous situation as his forces attempted to withdraw from Rome to the formidable Gothic Line north of Florence. That the Germans were especially vulnerable to Italian partisans was not lost on Alexander, who appealed in a radio broadcast for Italians to kill Germans "wherever you encounter them". Kesselring responded by authorising the "massive employment of artillery, grenade and mortars, armoured cars, flamethrowers and other technical combat equipment" against the partisans.

On 17 June, Kesselring issued a directive, "New Measures for Combating Partisans" (Bandenbekämpfung), in which he authorised measures of "utmost severity", while extolling his troops to act irrespective of "mistaken" actions they may be responsible for. The order promised indemnity to soldiers who "exceed our normal restraint in the choice of severity of the methods against the partisans". He also authorised construction of transit camps to hold suspected partisans and civilians. Three days later, Kesselring issued an order authorising reprisals against the civilian population and public executions of captured partisan leaders.

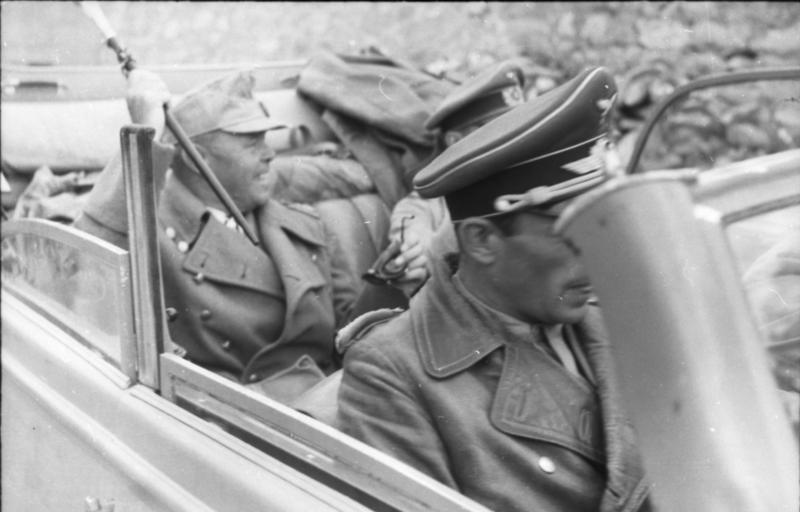
Kesselring in his staff car

Subsequently, massacres were carried out by the Hermann Göring Panzer Division at Stia in April, Civitella in Val di Chiana in June and Bucine in July 1944, by the 26th Panzer Division at Padule di Fucecchio on 23 August 1944, and by the 16th SS Panzergrenadier Division Reichsführer-SS at Sant'Anna di Stazzema in August 1944 and Marzabotto in September and October 1944.

In August 1944 Kesselring was informed by Rudolf Rahn, the German ambassador to the rump Italian Social Republic (RSI), that Mussolini had filed protests about the killing of Italian citizens. In response, Kesselring rescinded his order and issued another edict to his troops on 21 August, acknowledging incidents that had "damaged the German Wehrmacht's reputation and discipline and which no longer have anything to do with reprisal operations", and launched investigations into specific cases that Mussolini cited. Between 21 July and 25 September 1944, 624 Germans were killed, 993 wounded and 872 missing in partisan operations, while some 9,520 partisans were killed. During the occupation of Italy, the Germans and their fascist allies are believed to have killed some 22,000 Italian civilians.

Throughout July and August 1944, Kesselring conducted a stubborn delaying action, gradually retreating to the Gothic Line. There, he was able to halt the Allied advance. Holding the Allies south of the Arno River for so long was another defensive success. Some partisan bands declared the area they occupied to be independent republics, including Domodossola in northern Italy on 26 September. Four days later Kesselring instructed Wolff to conduct an "anti-partisan week". By the end of October, 1,539 partisans were dead, another 1,248 were captured, 1,973 suspects had been arrested, and 2,012 had been handed over to Organisation Todt. A further blow to the partisans came from Alexander. In a radio broadcast on 13 November, he conceded that the Germans would not be driven from their positions until spring, and asked the partisans to lay down their arms until then.

Casualties of the Gothic Line battles in September and October 1944 included Kesselring himself. On 23 October 1944, his car, travelling at night under blackout conditions, collided with a towed artillery piece coming out of a side road. Kesselring suffered serious head and facial injuries. He was taken to hospital in Ferrara, and did not return to his command until January 1945.

=== Central Europe ===
Furthermore, we knew that in command of these forces was Field Marshal Albert Kesselring, one of the ablest officers in the Hitler armies. He had served with distinction in the German artillery, and the air force and had been on the General Staff prior to the war. Kesselring was well-qualified, both as a commander and an administrator, and he conducted the Axis operations in Italy with great skill for two years, after which he was transferred to the Western Front in Germany. I was glad to see him go. He was quick to reorganise his forces and shift reserves to meet our attacks ...

— Mark Clark

As he later wrote, after he recovered from the car accident, Kesselring was summoned by Hitler to relieve Generalfeldmarschall Rundstedt as Commander-in-Chief West on 10 March 1945, following the disastrous loss of the intact Ludendorff Bridge over the Rhine during the Battle of Remagen. On arrival, he told his new staff, "Well, gentlemen, I am the new V-3", referring to the Vergeltungswaffe ("vengeance" weapons). Given the desperate situation of the Western Front, this was another sign of Kesselring's proverbial optimism. Kesselring still described Hitler's analysis of the situation as "lucid", according to which the Germans were about to inflict a historical defeat upon the Soviets, after which the victorious German armies would be brought west to crush the Allies and sweep them from the continent. Therefore, Kesselring was determined to hold in the west and await a victory in the east. Kesselring endorsed Hitler's order that deserters should be hanged from the nearest tree. When a staff officer sought to make him aware of the hopelessness of the situation, Kesselring told him that he had driven through the entire army rear area and not seen a single hanged man.

The Western Front at this time generally followed the Rhine with two important exceptions: the American bridgehead over the Rhine at Remagen, and a large German salient west of the Rhine, the Saar–Palatinate triangle. In his memoirs, Kesselring stated that he gave consideration to evacuating the triangle, but OKW ordered it held. When Kesselring paid his first visit to the German First and Seventh Army headquarters there on 13 March 1945, the army group commander, SS-Oberst-Gruppenführer und Generaloberst of the Waffen-SS Paul Hausser, and the two army commanders all affirmed the defence of the triangle could only result in heavy losses or complete annihilation of their commands. General der Infanterie Hans Felber of the Seventh Army considered the latter the most likely outcome. Nonetheless, Kesselring insisted that the positions had to be held.

The triangle was already under attack from two sides by Lieutenant General George Patton's US Third Army and Lieutenant General Alexander Patch's US Seventh Army. The German position soon crumbled and Kesselring later wrote that Hitler reluctantly sanctioned a withdrawal. The First and Seventh Armies suffered heavy losses: around 113,000 German casualties at the cost of 17,000 on the Allied side. Nonetheless, they had avoided encirclement and managed to conduct a skilful delaying action, evacuating the last troops to the east bank of the Rhine on 25 March 1945.

As Germany was cut in two, Kesselring's command was enlarged to include Army Groups Centre, South and South-East on the Eastern Front, along with Army Group C in Italy, and his own Army Group G and Army Group Upper Rhine. On 30 April, Hitler committed suicide in Berlin. The next day, Großadmiral Karl Dönitz was designated Reichspräsident and the Flensburg government was created. One of the new president's first acts was the appointment of Kesselring as Commander-in-Chief of Southern Germany, with plenipotentiary powers.

==== Chaotic surrender ====
Meanwhile, in Italy, Wolff and Vietinghoff, now commander of Army Group C, had almost concluded a preliminary surrender agreement with the OSS chief in Switzerland, Allen Dulles. Known as Operation Sunrise, these secret negotiations had been in progress since early March 1945. Kesselring was aware of them, having previously consented to them, although he had not informed his own staff. According to his memoirs, Kesselring did later inform Hitler. At the last minute, Kesselring had a change of heart and decided not to accept the agreement, as he felt it might imperil Army Group G. On 30 April, he relieved both Vietinghoff and his chief of staff, General der Panzertruppe Hans Röttiger, putting them at the disposition of the OKW for a possible court martial. They were replaced by General der Infanterie Friedrich Schulz and Generalmajor Friedrich Wenzel respectively.

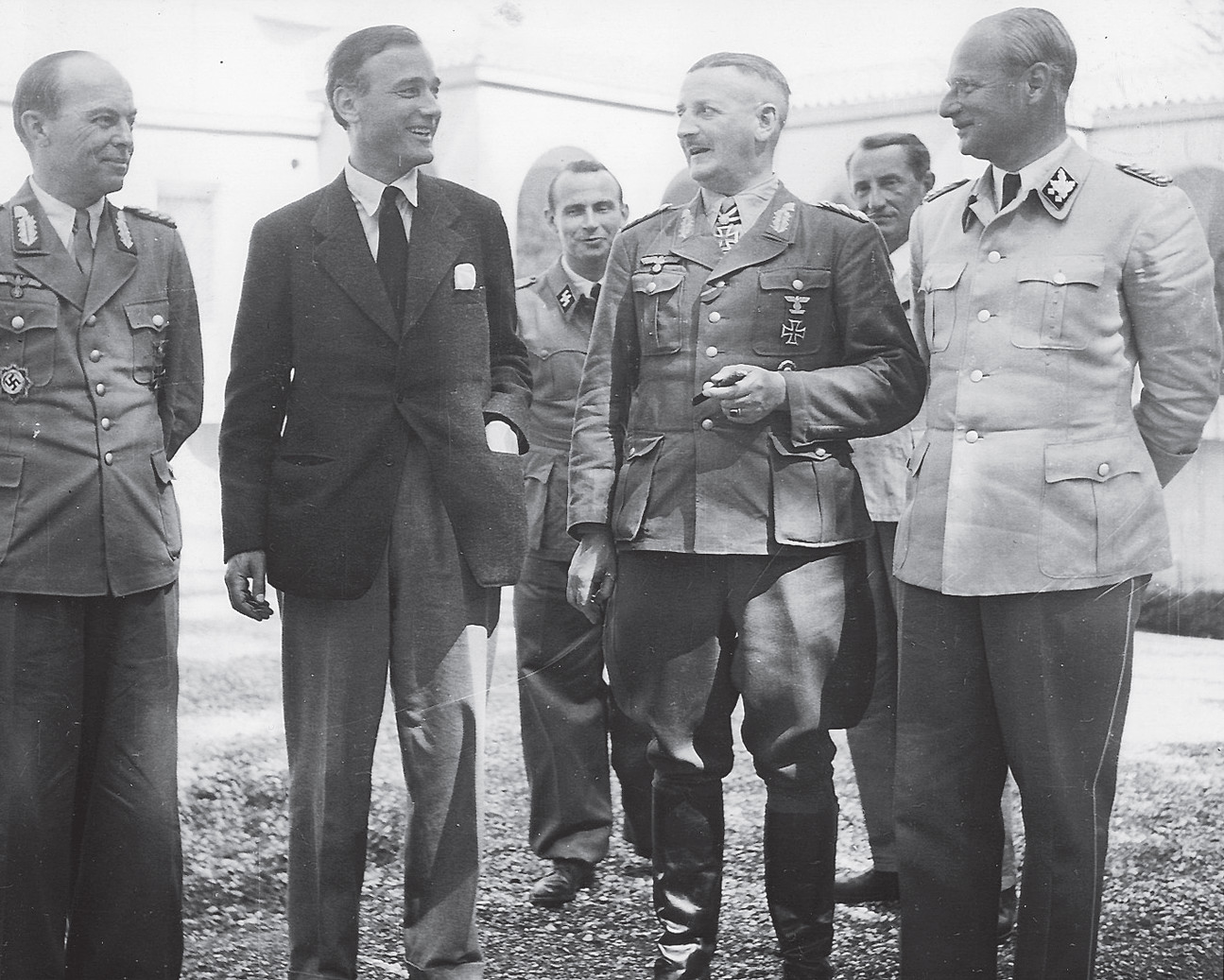
Gero von Schulze-Gaevernitz visits German headquarters in Bozen on 12 May 1945. Left to right: Hans Röttiger, Gaevernitz, Eugen Wenner, Heinrich von Vietinghoff, Eugen Dollmann and Karl Wolff.

The next morning, 1 May, Röttiger reacted by placing both Schulz and Wenzel under arrest and summoning Lemelsen to take Schulz's place. Lemelsen initially refused, as he was in possession of a written order from Kesselring which prohibited any talks with the enemy without his explicit authorisation. By this time, Vietinghoff and Wolff had concluded an armistice with Alexander, who was now a field marshal and the Allied Commander-in-Chief of the Mediterranean Theatre. The armistice became effective at 14:00 on 2 May.

Lemelsen reached Bozen, and Schulz and Wenzel regained control, this time agreeing with the officers pushing for a quick surrender. The German armies in Italy were now utterly defeated by the Allies, who were rapidly advancing from Garmisch toward Innsbruck. Kesselring remained opposed to the surrender but was finally won over by Wolff on the late morning of 2 May after a two-hour phone call to Kesselring at his headquarters in Pullach.

North of the Alps, Army Group G followed suit on 6 May. According to his memoirs, Kesselring now decided to surrender his own headquarters. He ordered Hausser to supervise the SS troops to ensure that the surrender was carried out in accordance with his instructions. Kesselring then surrendered to an American major at Saalfelden, near Salzburg, in Austria on 9 May 1945. He was taken to see Major General Maxwell D. Taylor, the commander of the US 101st Airborne Division, who treated him courteously, allowing him to keep his weapons and field marshal's baton, and to visit the Eastern Front headquarters of Army Groups Centre and South at Zeltweg and Graz unescorted. Taylor arranged for Kesselring and his staff to move into a hotel at Berchtesgaden. Photographs of Taylor and Kesselring drinking tea together created a stir in the United States.

In his post-war memoirs, Kesselring said he envisaged making a start on the rehabilitation of Germany following the end of the war. Instead, he was arrested. On 15 May 1945, Kesselring was taken to Mondorf-les-Bains where his baton and decorations were taken from him and he was incarcerated. He was held in American POW camps before being transferred to British custody in 1946. He testified at the Nuremberg trial of Göring, but his offers to testify against Soviet, American and British commanders were declined.

== Post-war ==
=== Trial ===
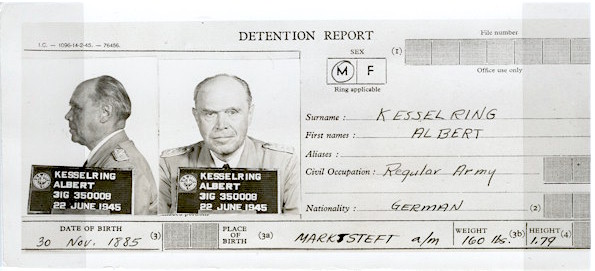
Albert Kesselring's detention report from June 1945. The photographs were taken while he was still wearing the dress uniform of a Generalfeldmarschall in the Luftwaffe.

By the end of the war, for many Italians, the name of Kesselring, whose signature appeared on posters and printed orders announcing draconian measures adopted by the German occupation, had become synonymous with the oppression and terror that had characterised the German occupation. Kesselring's name headed the list of German officers blamed for a long series of atrocities perpetrated by the German forces.

The Moscow Declaration of October 1943 promised that "those German officers and men and members of the Nazi party who have been responsible for or have taken a consenting part in the above atrocities, massacres and executions will be sent back to the countries in which their abominable deeds were done in order that they may be judged and punished according to the laws of these liberated countries and of free governments which will be erected therein." However, the British, who were the driving force in moulding the war crimes trial policy that culminated in the Nuremberg trials, explicitly excluded high-ranking German officers in their custody.

The British held two major trials against the top German war criminals who had perpetrated crimes during the Italian campaign. For political reasons, it was decided to hold the trials in Italy, but a request by Italy to allow an Italian judge to participate was denied on the grounds that Italy was not an Allied country. The trials were held under a royal warrant dated 18 June 1945, thus under British military law. This decision put the trials on a shaky legal basis, as foreign nationals were being tried for crimes against foreigners in a foreign country. The first trial, held in Rome, was of Mackensen and Generalleutnant Kurt Mälzer, the military commandant of Rome, for their part in the Ardeatine massacre. Both were sentenced to death on 30 November 1946.

Kesselring's own trial began in Venice on 17 February 1947. The British military court was presided over by Major General Sir Edmund Hakewill-Smith, assisted by four lieutenant colonels. Colonel Richard C. Halse—who had already obtained the death penalty for Mackensen and Mälzer—was the prosecutor. Kesselring's legal team was headed by Hans Laternser, a skilful German lawyer who specialised in Anglo-Saxon law, had represented several defendants at the Nuremberg trials, and later represented Generalfeldmarschall Erich von Manstein. Kesselring's ability to pay his legal team was hampered because his assets had been frozen by the Allies, but his legal costs were eventually met by friends in South America and relatives in Franconia.

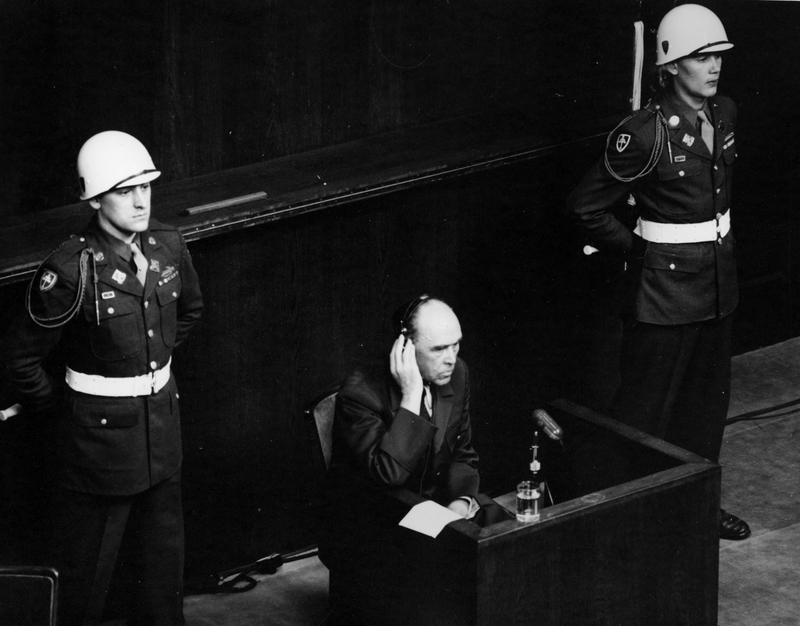
Kesselring testifying as a witness at the Nuremberg war crimes trials

Kesselring was arraigned on two charges: the shooting of 335 Italians in the Ardeatine massacre, and incitement to kill Italian civilians. He did not invoke the "Nuremberg defence" (although Laternser did in his closing arguments). Rather, Kesselring maintained that the order to kill ten Italian civilians for each German soldier killed by partisans was "just and lawful". On 6 May 1947, the court found him guilty of both charges and sentenced him to death by firing squad, which was considered more honourable than hanging. Although the court accepted the legality of the taking of hostages, it left open the question of the legality of killing innocent persons in reprisals; the distinction between the two was later clarified in the High Command Trial. (Note: In 1996, Richard Raiber determined that Kesselring was absent in northern Italy when the orders for the Ardeatine massacre were issued, and was therefore innocent of the charge. The question then arose as to why he had accepted responsibility for something he had not done. Raiber speculated that it might have been to conceal involvement in the Ginny executions, but conceded that he had uncovered no evidence of this. Kerstin von Lingen independently confirmed Kesselring's absence but rejected Raiber's thesis. She suggested instead that Kesselring might have done so out of loyalty to his chief of staff, General der Kavallerie Siegfried Westphal. Kesselring's guilt on the second charge, however, is well-established.)

The planned major trial for the campaign of reprisals never took place, but a series of smaller trials were held instead in Padua between April and June 1947 for SS-Brigadeführer Willy Tensfeld, Navy Kapitänleutnant Waldemar Krumhaar, the 26th Panzer Division's Generalleutnant Eduard Crasemann, and SS-Gruppenführer Max Simon of the 16th SS Panzergrenadier Division Reichsführer-SS. Tensfeld was acquitted; Crasemann was sentenced to 10 years; and Simon was sentenced to death, but his sentence was commuted. Simon's trial was the last held in Italy by the British. By 1949, British military tribunals had sentenced 230 Germans to death and another 447 to custodial sentences.

The only trial of German generals held by U.S. military tribunals in Italy was that of General der Infanterie Anton Dostler, the commander of the LXXV Army Corps, and Generalleutnant Kurt Mälzer. Dostler stood trial in October 1945 for the execution of the 15 members of the US 2677th Special Reconnaissance Battalion during Operation Ginny. He was found guilty and shot on 1 December 1945. Mälzer stood trial in September 1946 for parading U.S. POWs through the streets of Rome in an abusive manner. Mälzer was found guilty and sentenced to 10 years in prison, although he was later transferred to British custody.

Several officers, all below the rank of general, including Kappler, were transferred to the Italian courts for trial. These applied very different legal standards from those in Britain, which were often more favourable to defendants. Although senior Wehrmacht commanders repeatedly attempted to shift blame for atrocities onto the SS, the most senior SS commanders in Italy, Wolff and Heinrich Himmler's personal representative in Italy, SS-Standartenführer Eugen Dollmann, escaped prosecution. In 1964, after Dulles had retired as head of the US Central Intelligence Agency, Wolff was convicted of genocide by a German court. He was released in 1969.

=== Commutation and release from prison ===
The death verdict against Kesselring generated outrage in the United Kingdom, where Kesselring was viewed sympathetically by his former foes, including the former Prime Minister, Winston Churchill, and Alexander, who sent a telegram to Prime Minister Clement Attlee in which he expressed his hope that Kesselring's sentence would be commuted. "As his old opponent on the battlefield", he stated, "I have no complaints against him. Kesselring and his soldiers fought against us hard but clean." Alexander had expressed his admiration for Kesselring as a military commander as early as 1943. In his 1961 memoirs, Alexander paid tribute to Kesselring as a commander who "showed great skill in extricating himself from the desperate situations into which his faulty intelligence had led him".

Alexander's sentiments were echoed by Lieutenant General Sir Oliver Leese, who had commanded the British Eighth Army in the Italian Campaign. In a May 1947 interview, Leese said he was "very sad" to hear of what he considered "British victor's justice" being imposed on Kesselring, an "extremely gallant soldier who had fought his battles fairly and squarely". Churchill remarked that "Kesselring was a good general, with a competent staff" in Triumph and Tragedy, the final volume of his History of the Second World War. Lord de L'Isle, who had been awarded the Victoria Cross for gallantry at Anzio, raised the issue in the House of Lords.

The Italian government refused to carry out death sentences: the death penalty was explicitly abolished in the Constitution of Italy, which was due to come into force in January 1948; the last executions carried out by Italian authorities occurred in March 1947, two months before Kesselnring's sentencing (see Villarbasse massacre). The Italian decision was very disappointing to the British government because the trials had partly been intended to meet the expectations of the Italian public. The War Office notified Lieutenant General Sir John Harding, who had succeeded Alexander as commander of British forces in the Mediterranean in 1946, that there should be no more death sentences and those already imposed should be commuted. Harding commuted the death sentences imposed on Mackensen, Mälzer and Kesselring to life imprisonment on 4 July 1947. Mälzer died while still in prison in February 1952. Mackensen, after having his sentence reduced to 21 years, was set free in October 1952.

In May 1947, Kesselring was moved from Mestre prison near Venice to Wolfsberg, Carinthia. In October 1947, he was transferred for the last time to Werl Prison, in Westphalia.

Kesselring resumed his work on a history of the war that he was writing for the US Army Historical Division. This effort, working under the direction of Generaloberst Franz Halder in 1946, brought together a number of German generals for the purpose of producing historical studies of the war, including Gotthard Heinrici, Heinz Guderian, Lothar Rendulic, Hasso von Manteuffel and Küchler. Kesselring contributed studies of the war in Italy and North Africa and the problems faced by the German high command. Kesselring also worked secretly on his memoirs. The manuscript was smuggled out by Irmgard Horn-Kesselring, Rainer's mother, who typed it at her home.

An influential group assembled in Britain to lobby for his release from prison. Headed by Lord Hankey, the group included politicians Lord de L'Isle and Richard Stokes, Alexander and Admiral of the Fleet The Earl of Cork and Orrery, and military historians Basil Liddell Hart and J. F. C. Fuller. Upon regaining the prime ministership in 1951, Winston Churchill, who was closely associated with the group, gave priority to the quick release of the war criminals remaining in British custody.

Meanwhile, in Germany, the release of military prisoners had become a political issue. With the establishment of West Germany in 1949, and the advent of the Cold War between the former Allies and the Soviet Union, it became inevitable that the German armed forces would be revived in some form, and there were calls for amnesty for military prisoners as a condition for German military participation in the Western Alliance. A media campaign gradually gathered steam in Germany. Westdeutsche Allgemeine Zeitung published an interview with Liny Kesselring and Stern ran a series about Kesselring and Manstein entitled "Justice, Not Clemency". The pressure on the British government was increased in 1952 when the German Chancellor Konrad Adenauer made it clear that West German ratification of the European Defence Community Treaty was dependent on the release of German military figures.

In July 1952, Kesselring was diagnosed with a cancerous growth in his throat. During World War I, he had frequently smoked up to twenty cigars per day but had quit smoking in 1925. Although the British were suspicious of the diagnosis, they were concerned that he might die in prison as Mälzer did, which would be a public relations disaster. Kesselring was transferred to a hospital under guard. In October 1952, he was released from his prison sentence on the grounds of ill health. His release unleashed a storm of protest in Italy.

=== Later life ===
In 1952, while still in the hospital, Kesselring accepted the honorary presidency of three veterans' organisations. The first was the Luftwaffenring, consisting of Luftwaffe veterans. The Verband deutsches Afrikakorps, the veterans' association of the Afrika Korps, soon followed. More controversial was the presidency of the right-wing veterans' association, Der Stahlhelm. The leadership of this organisation tarnished his reputation. He attempted to reform the organisation, proposing that the new German flag be flown instead of the old Imperial Flag; that the old Stahlhelm greeting Front heil! be abolished; and that members of the Social Democratic Party of Germany be allowed to join. The response from the organisation was unenthusiastic.

Kesselring's release caused an outcry and indignation in the Italian Parliament. Kesselring reacted provocatively, asserting that he had saved the lives of millions of Italians by not following certain orders and that they ought to build him a monument. In response, on 4 December 1952, Piero Calamandrei, an Italian jurist, soldier, university professor, and politician, who had been a leader of the Italian resistance movement, penned an anti-fascist poem, Lapide ad ignominia ("A Monument to Ignominy"). In the poem, Calamandrei stated that if Kesselring returned, he would indeed find a monument, but one stronger than stone, composed of Italian resistance fighters who "willingly took up arms, to preserve dignity, not to promote hate, and who decided to fight back against the shame and terror of the world". Calamandrei's poem appears on monuments in the towns of Cuneo, Montepulciano and Sant'Anna di Stazzema.

Kesselring's memoirs were published in 1953, as Soldat bis zum letzten Tag (A Soldier to the Last Day). The English edition was published a year later as A Soldier's Record. Kesselring's contentions that the Luftwaffe was not defeated in the air in the Battle of Britain and that Operation Sea Lion—the invasion of Britain—was thought about, but never seriously planned, were controversial. During the 1950s, in the absence of other sources, military historians often used memoirs as sources. An important flaw in his memoirs was a reluctance to criticise others, to the extent of representing decisions with which he strongly disagreed at the time as being the product of consensus.

The book sold well, but critics were cautious. While recognising his talents as a general, Die Zeit noted that Kesselring "clearly never posed himself the question: 'Where does blind obedience end and a sense of responsibility start to take effect, if not at the highest levels of command?'" Reviewing the English edition, Lieutenant General Lucian K. Truscott Jr., who had commanded the US 3rd Infantry Division, VI Corps and Fifth Army in Italy, reviewed the book for The New York Times. He noted the esteem in which Kesselring was held by his enemies, but also the "thread of self-justification for the indifference of himself and fellow officers to Nazi excesses." In 1955, Kesselring published a second book, Gedanken zum Zweiten Weltkrieg (Thoughts on the Second World War).

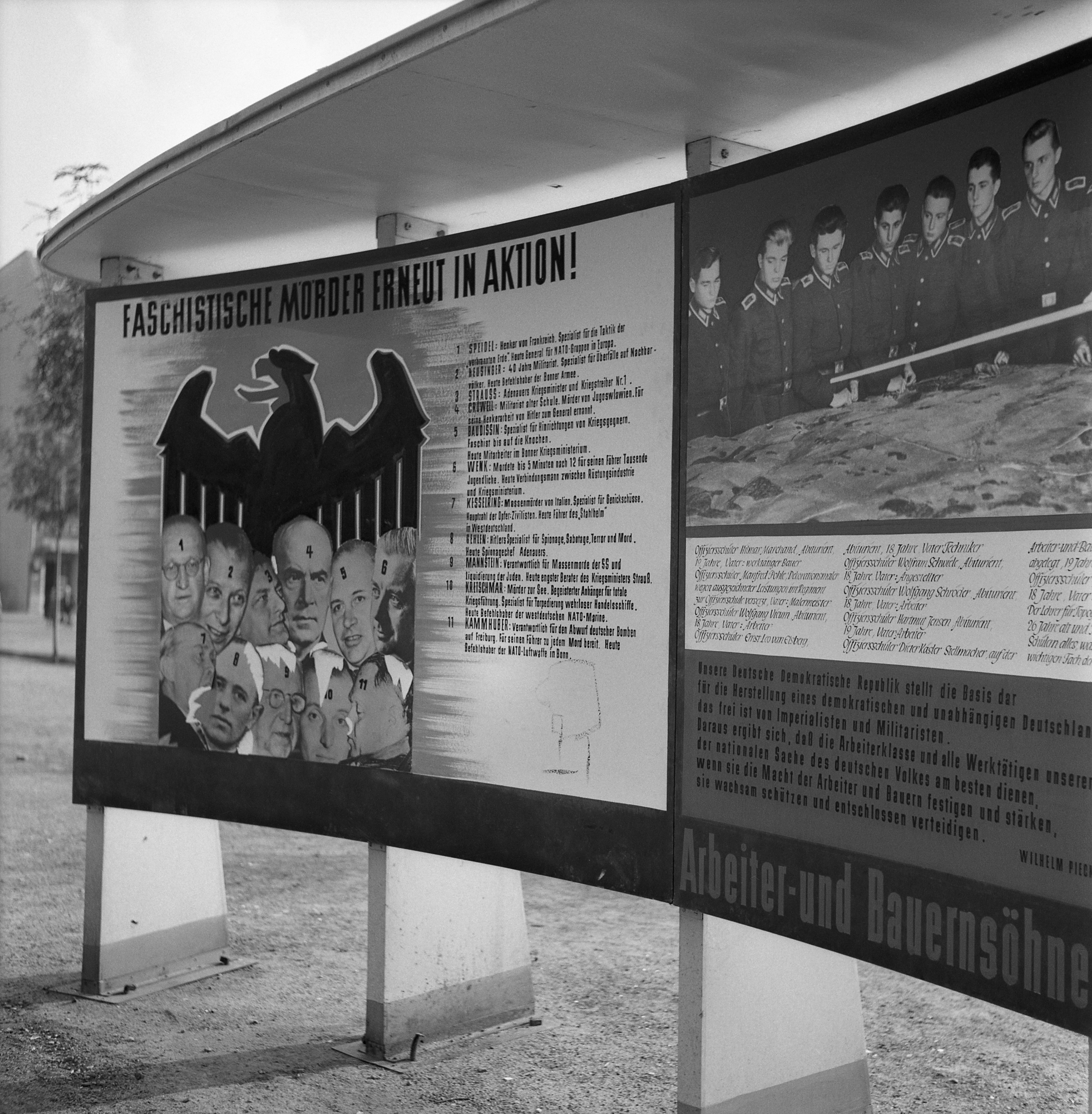
Kesselring's face on an East German propaganda poster as a "fascist murderer" in 1957

Kesselring protested what he regarded as the "unjustly smirched reputation of the German soldier". In November 1953, testifying at a war crimes trial, he warned that "there won't be any volunteers for the new German army if the German government continues to try German soldiers for acts committed in World War II". He enthusiastically supported the European Defence Community and suggested that the "war opponents of yesterday must become the peace comrades and friends of tomorrow". On the other hand, he also declared that he found "astonishing" those who believe "that we must revise our ideas in accordance with democratic principles ... That is more than I can take."

In March 1954, Kesselring and Liny toured Austria, ostensibly as private citizens. He met with former comrades-in-arms and prison-mates, some of them former SS members, causing embarrassment to the Austrian government, which ordered his deportation. He ignored the order and completed his tour before leaving a week later, as he had intended. His only official government service was on the Medals Commission, which was established by President Theodor Heuss. Ultimately, the commission unanimously recommended that medals should be permitted to be worn—but without the swastika. He was an expert witness for the "Generals' Trials". The Generals' Trials were trials of German citizens before German courts for crimes committed in Germany, the most prominent of which was that of Generalfeldmarschall Ferdinand Schörner.

== Death ==
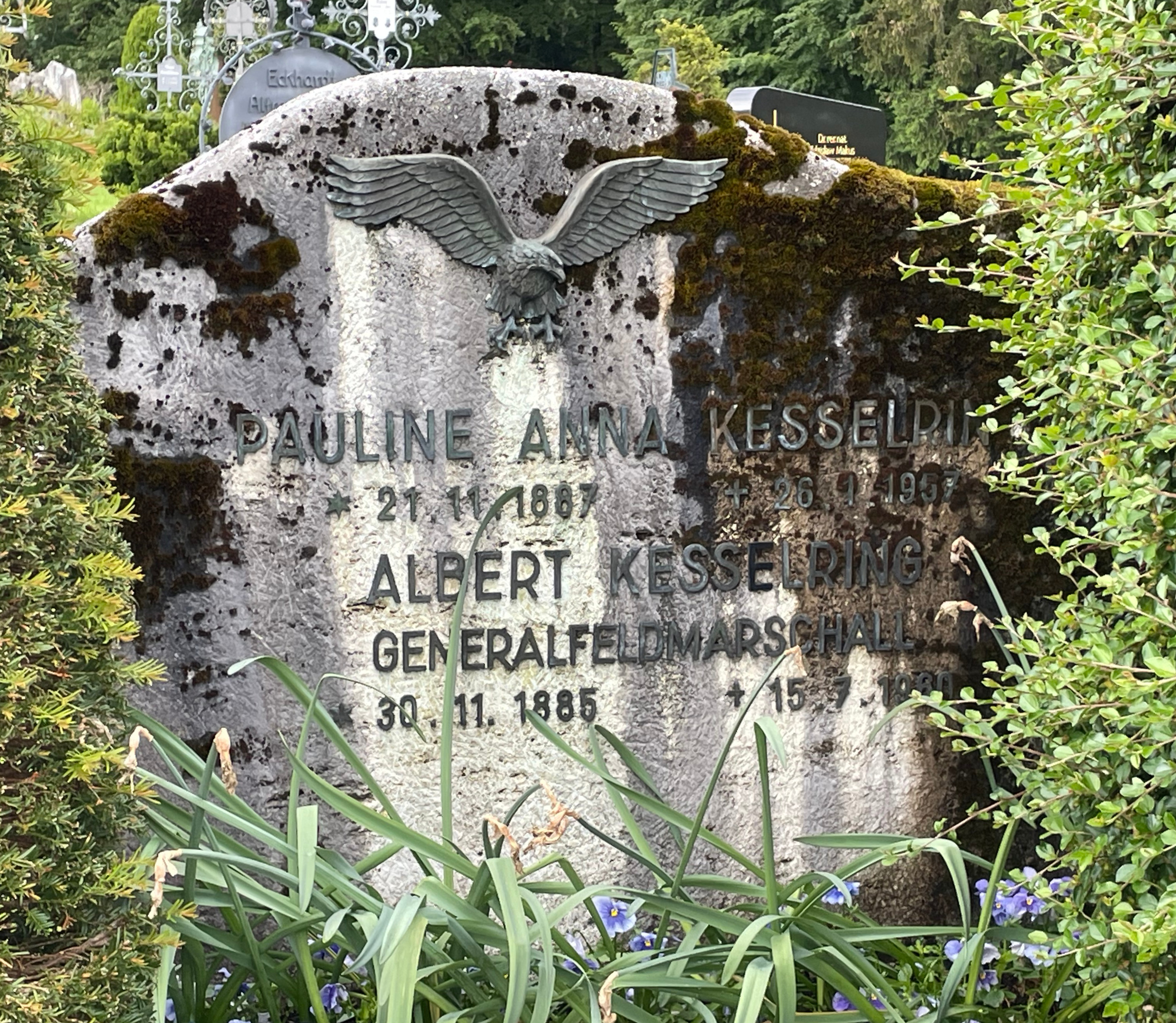
Gravestone at Bad Wiessee Mountain Cemetery

Kesselring died in a sanatorium at Bad Nauheim in West Germany, on 15 July 1960 at the age of 74, following a heart attack. He was given a quasi-military Stahlhelm funeral and buried in Bergfriedhof Cemetery in Bad Wiessee. Members of Stahlhelm acted as his pallbearers and fired a rifle volley over his grave. His former chief of staff, General der Kavallerie Siegfried Westphal, spoke for the veterans of North Africa and Italy, describing Kesselring as "a man of admirable strength of character whose care was for soldiers of all ranks". Inspekteur der Luftwaffe Josef Kammhuber spoke on behalf of the Luftwaffe and Bundeswehr, expressing the hope that Kesselring would be remembered for his earlier accomplishments rather than for his later activities. Also present were the former SS-Oberst-Gruppenführer Sepp Dietrich, ex-Chancellor Franz von Papen, Schörner, Grand Admiral Karl Dönitz, Otto Remer, SS-Standartenführer Joachim Peiper and Rahn.

In 2000, a memorial event was held in Bad Wiessee marking the fortieth anniversary of Kesselring's death. No representatives of the Bundeswehr attended, on the grounds that Kesselring was "not worthy of being part of our tradition". Instead, two veterans groups, the Deutsche Montecassino Vereinigung (German Monte Cassino Association) and the Bund Deutscher Fallschirmjäger (Association of German Paratroopers), took on the task of remembering Kesselring. To his ageing troops, Kesselring remained a commander to be commemorated.

=== Baton ===
Kesselring's Generalfeldmarschall's baton was seized by a private serving as a scout with the US 2nd Armored Division, the first US division to enter Berlin, in July 1945. He was ordered to search castles that had been used by high-ranking German officers and found the baton. It remained in his possession until his death in 1977, when it passed to his widow, and then to his son, who put it up for auction by Alex Cooper auctioneers in 2010. Expected to fetch between US$10,000 and $15,000, it was sold to a private bidder for $731,600.

== Notes ==
Military offices
Preceded by Generalleutnant Walther Wever	Chief of the Luftwaffe General Staff; 3 June 1936 – 31 May 1937	Succeeded by General der Flieger Hans-Jürgen Stumpff
Preceded by none	Commander of Luftflotte 1; 1 February 1939 – 11 January 1940	Succeeded by Generaloberst Hans-Jürgen Stumpff
Preceded by General der Flieger Hellmuth Felmy	Commander of Luftflotte 2; 12 January 1940 – 11 June 1943	Succeeded by Generalfeldmarschall Wolfram Freiherr von Richthofen
Preceded by none	Oberbefehlshaber Süd; 2 December 1941 – 10 March 1945	Succeeded by Generaloberst Heinrich von Vietinghoff
Preceded by Generalfeldmarschall Gerd von Rundstedt	Oberbefehlshaber West; 11 March 1945 – 22 April 1945	Succeeded by none
