= Kriegsakademie =

Kriegsakademie (German for 'war academy') may refer to:

- War Academy (Kingdom of Bavaria) of the Royal Bavarian Army, located in Munich (1867–1914)
- Prussian Military Academy of the Royal Prussian Army, located in Berlin

== See also ==
- military academy
- Kriegsschule, German military training school.
