= Bombing of Minsk in World War II =

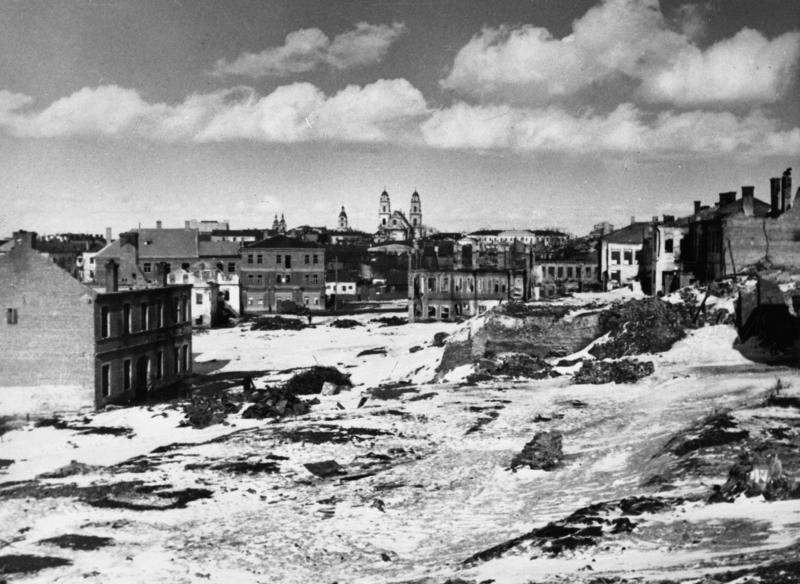
Minsk after the bombing.

The Minsk Blitz was the heavy bombing of the city of Minsk (population was 270,000), the capital of the Byelorussian Soviet Socialist Republic within the Soviet Union during the Second World War. On 24 June 1941, three waves of German Luftwaffe bombers, 47 aircraft each, bombed Minsk. The Soviet anti-aircraft defense of the city was poorly organized, and panic ensued. Because the water supply was destroyed, fires could not be put down, and the city was evacuated.

As much as 85% of the city's buildings and the entire infrastructure was destroyed. More than 1,000 people were killed.

== See also ==
- German occupation of Byelorussia during World War II
