= War Academy (Kingdom of Bavaria) =

Military training facility in Bavaria

Coordinates: 48°08′50″N 11°33′04″E

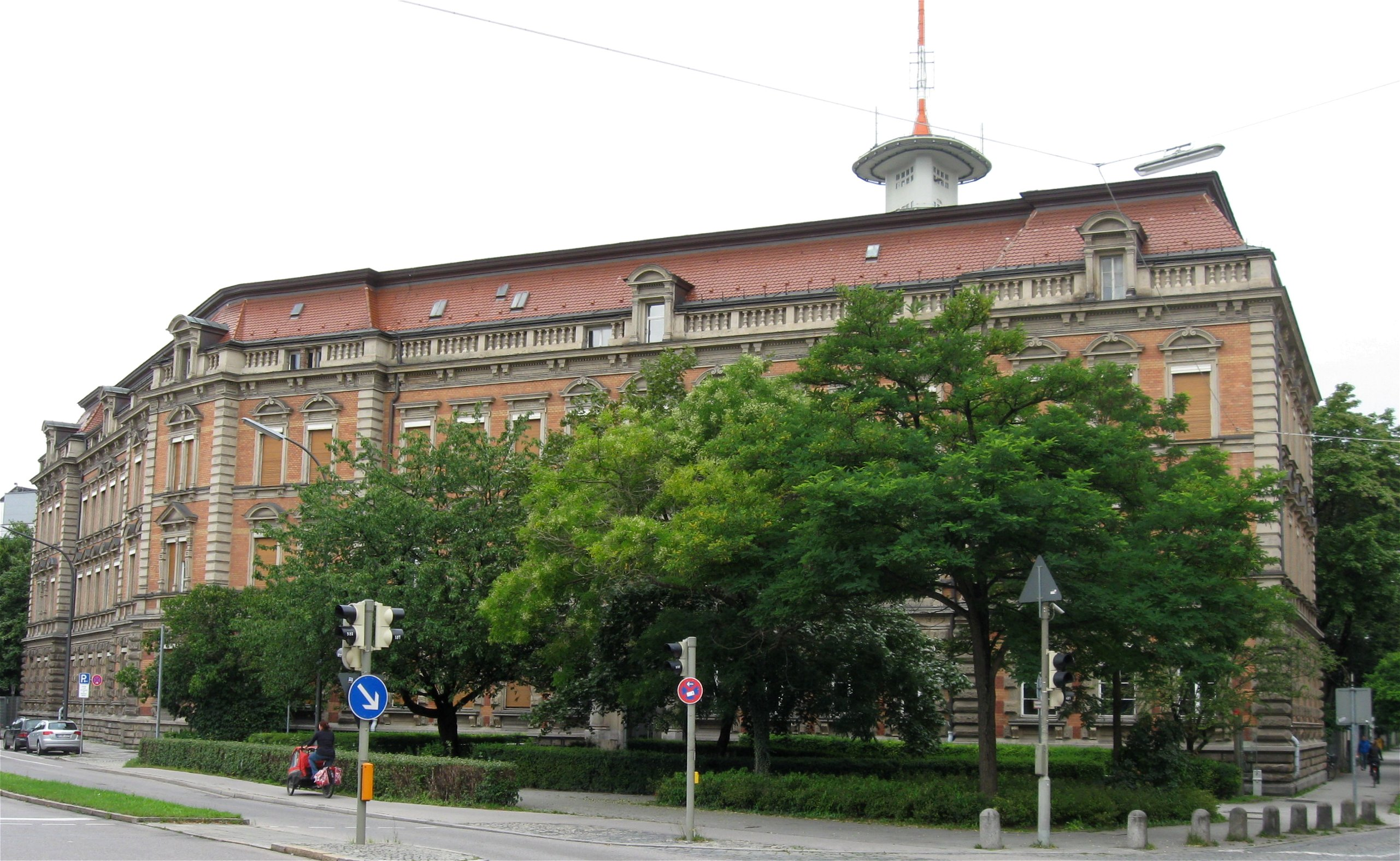
The building of the Bavarian War College today

The Bavarian War College, also Bavarian Staff College (Ge: Bayerische Kriegsakademie) was the highest military facility to educate, instruct, train, and develop general staff officers.

It was active from 1867 to the beginning of World War I in 1914. For a better comparison, equivalent institutions of other countries were those like the older and ten times larger Prussian War College of the Prussian Army in Berlin or the k.u.k Kriegsschule (also a War College) of the Austrian Army in Vienna.

The War College was subordinated to the Inspektion der Militärbildungs-Anstalten, a department of the Ministry of War, which was responsible for all training and institutions of the Bavarian Army.

== Location ==
Like the Military Academy (Ge: Kriegsschule) and the cadet corps of the Bavarian army, it was located in Munich, southwesterly of the corner Blutenburgstraße and Pappenheimstraße, nearby to the parade-ground on the Marsfeld and the later infantry barracks "Marsfeldkaserne", which were completed in 1888.

== Education and training ==
Officers of all branches except these of the railroad troops, who were designated for adjutant services as well as candidates for the general staff or for military sciences had to attend the Kriegsakademie. The program of the Kriegsakademie included higher education in tactics, weaponry, fortification theory, army organization, topography and languages, as well as military foot drill, sports, riding and shooting training, completed by courses in strategies, military and general history, geography, philosophy, mathematics and physics.

== Bibliography ==
- Othmar Hackl: Die bayerische Kriegsakademie (1867-1914)., in Schriftenreihe zur bayerischen Landesgeschichte, vol. 89, Munich, 1989
