= Moro River campaign =

Military campaign during World War II

- Part of the Winter Line and the battle for Rome of the Italian campaign, World War II
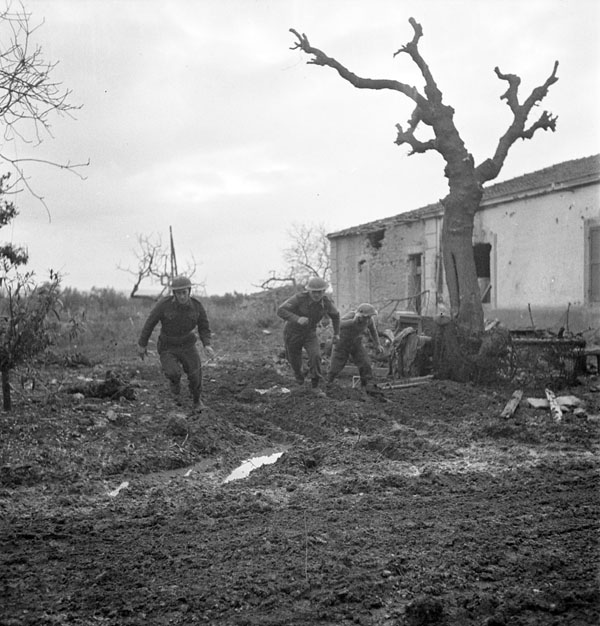
- Riflemen of the 48th Highlanders of Canada take cover during German counterattack north of San Leonardo, 10 December 1943
Date	4 December 1943 – 4 January 1944
Location	Moro River, eastern Italy
Result	See Aftermath

Belligerents
United Kingdom: (British Raj) British India; Canada; New Zealand	Germany

Commanders and leaders
(United Kingdom) Harold Alexander; (United Kingdom) Bernard Montgomery; (United Kingdom) Charles Allfrey; (United Kingdom) Miles Dempsey	(Nazi Germany) Albert Kesselring; (Nazi Germany) Heinrich von Vietinghoff (Note: von Vietinghoff went to Germany on sick leave in late November and Lemelsen commanded the Tenth Army during the major actions on the Bernhardt Line in December. Von Vietinghof returned in early January); (Nazi Germany) Joachim Lemelsen; (Nazi Germany) Traugott Herr

Strength
4 infantry divisions; 2 armoured brigades	1 Panzer division; 1 parachute division; 2 Panzergrenadier divisions

Casualties and losses
(Canada) 2,339 casualties; (Dominion of New Zealand) 1,600 casualties (Note: From 9 November to 31 December which includes therefore casualties during the operations on the Sangro river); (British Raj) 3,400 casualties (Note: Includes casualties on the Sangro and Moro,); (United Kingdom) Unknown	Unknown

The Moro River campaign was an important battle of the Italian campaign during the Second World War, fought between elements of the British Eighth Army and LXXVI Panzer Corps (LXXVI Panzerkorps) of the German 10th Army (10. Armee). Lasting from 4 December 1943 to 4 January 1944, the campaign occurred primarily in the vicinity of the Moro River in eastern Italy. The campaign was designed as part of an offensive launched by General Sir Harold Alexander's Allied 15th Army Group, with the intention of breaching the German Army's Winter Line defensive system and advancing to Pescara—and eventually Rome.

Beginning on 4 December, four infantry divisions—one British, one Canadian, one Indian and one New Zealand (which included an armoured brigade)—and two armoured brigades (one British and one Canadian) of V Corps and XIII Corps attacked heavily defended German positions along the Moro River, achieving several exploitable bridgeheads by 8 December. Throughout the next week, nearly continuous combat operations by both sides—designed to keep one another pinned down—created stagnated defensive positions near Orsogna and a narrow pit known as "The Gully". After being held at the Gully for 10 days, the Canadians succeeded in outflanking German defences, and forcing a German withdrawal to the Ortona–Orsogna Line. On 20 December, the line was attacked by both corps.

By 26 December, strong German defences had stalled Canadian forces during the Battle of Ortona and British and New Zealand forces in Orsogna. Although both Ortona and Villa Grande were captured by the end of December, general exhaustion among the Allied forces prevented the capture of Orsogna and an advance to Pescara. When harsh winter weather set in, it became clear to the Allied commanders that no further progress would be made and General Alexander called off the offensive.

== Background ==
Map of the campaign

In late 1943, the 15th Army Group under General Sir Harold Alexander were fighting their way northward in Italy against determined German opposition, commanded by Generalfeldmarschall Albert Kesselring, whose forces had prepared a succession of defensive lines. East of the Apennine Mountain spine was the British Eighth Army, under General Sir Bernard Montgomery. In October, the Eighth Army had crossed the Biferno river and pushed the German defenders from the Volturno-Viktor Line defences. Delayed by logistical problems, they were not able to attack the next line of defences (the Barbara Line) behind the Trigno river until 2 November. However, by 9 November forward elements of the Eighth Army were in contact with the forward defences of the German Winter Line, which had been set on the high ground north of the Sangro River.

The main attack across the Sangro by V Corps (Lieutenant-General Charles Allfrey), comprising the British 78th Infantry Division (Major-General Vyvyan Evelegh) and 8th Indian Infantry Division (Major-General Dudley Russell) with supporting and diversionary attacks further inland by the 2nd New Zealand Division (Lieutenant-General Sir Bernard Freyberg) and XIII Corps (Lieutenant-General Miles Dempsey) was delayed by bad weather until late November. After several days of hard fighting, the Germans withdrew to the defences they had prepared on the high ground to the north of the Moro river.

=== Offensive strategy and order of battle ===
The Moro River runs from the central mountain spine of Italy to the Adriatic coast south of Ortona. The German defences on the Moro were a centerpiece of the Winter Line, which guarded the eastern side of the Apennines along Route 5. Montgomery hoped to punch through the Winter Line, capture Ortona and Pescara and advance to Rome. The British 78th Infantry Division, which had been spearheading V Corps since the Volturno Line actions and had sustained over 7,000 casualties in less than six months, was relieved by the fresh 1st Canadian Infantry Division (Major-General Christopher Vokes), ready to renew the offensive on 5 December 1943. The 78th Infantry Division was sent into the mountains on the relatively quiet left wing of the army, joining the British 5th Infantry Division (Major-General Gerard Bucknall) under XIII Corps.

Montgomery's plan was for the 1st Canadian Division to attack across the Moro in the coastal lowlands to take Ortona first and then Pescara. Inland, in the jagged hills above the headwaters of the Moro, the relatively fresh 2nd New Zealand Division would attack toward Orsogna, while between these two the 8th Indian Infantry Division would hold the centre of the front in a relatively static role.

Facing the British V Corps was the 1st Parachute Division (1. Fallschirmjägerdivision) under Brigadier General (Generalmajor) Richard Heidrich on the coast, to their right stood the 90th Panzergrenadier Division (90. Panzergrenadierdivision) under Major General Carl-Hans Lungershausen succeeded by Colonel (Oberst) Ernst-Günther Baade on 20 December, and further inland of them was the 26th Panzer Division (26. Panzerdivision) under Brigadier General Smilo Freiherr von Lüttwitz with their right flank on Orsogna. Further inland, facing the British XIII Corps, was the 65th Infantry Division (65. Infantriedivision) under Brigadier General Hellmuth Pfeifer supported by elements of 1st Parachute and 5th Mountain Division (5. Gebirgsdivision) under Brigadier General Julius Ringel. Together, these units formed Traugott Herr′s LXXVI Panzer Corps, the part of Joachim Lemelsen's 10th Army responsible for the front line to the east of the Apennines.

== Campaign ==
=== Canadian division across the Moro ===
On 6 December 1943, Canadian forces began a series of large-scale assaults on major crossing points along the Moro River with the objective of securing a large bridgehead along the defensive line. Three primary points of attack were chosen: Villa Rogatti, along the western edge of the Canadian sector; San Leonardo, 5 km (3.1 mi) south of Ortona; and San Donato, a small town near the Italian coast. Five primary infantry battalions were selected to assault these positions with the objective of crossing the Moro River. The offensives were scheduled to start on the morning of 6 December.

=== Villa Rogatti ===
The task of taking Villa Rogatti, the westernmost crossing point, was given to Princess Patricia's Canadian Light Infantry (PPCLI). Having conducted reconnaissance on their objective during the night of 5 December 1943, an attack plan was devised by the battalion's commander—Lieutenant-Colonel Cameron Bethel Ware—detailing the objectives of all four rifle companies. Once the objectives had been secured by the early morning of 6 December, Anglo-Canadian reinforcements were to be moved into Villa Rogatti, with the intention of repulsing the expected potentially strong German counterattacks. Elements of three German regiments—the 200th and 361st Panzergrenadier, and 26th Panzer—maintained strong defences within the town.

At 00:00 on 5 December, two companies of the PPCLI crossed the Moro River, moving towards Villa Rogatti. Within an hour, vicious fighting had erupted throughout the town as the two companies of Canadian infantry struggled to break the German defensive lines. As B Company broke through the German defences, A Company attacked to the northeast, continuing to engage 200th Panzergrenadier Regiment (200. Panzergrenadier Regiment) near Villa Rogatti. Although two Canadian infantry companies now occupied Villa Rogatti, German Panzergrenadier forces still maintained substantial defences on the outskirts of the town. However, C Company continued to advance steadily along the eastern side of the town, encountering significant resistance from the 361st Panzergrenadier Regiment (361. Panzergrenadier-Regiment). After approximately an hour of fighting by C and D Companies, Villa Rogatti had been occupied by Canadian forces shortly before dawn.

By mid-morning, German counterattacks on PPCLI positions in the town had begun, involving tanks from the 7th Company of the 26th Panzer Regiment (26. Panzer-Regiment), field guns and substantial infantry forces. Throughout the afternoon two infantry companies of the PPCLI fought off several attacks by German forces, eventually managing to push them back to the vineyards on the northern edge of the town. While the PPCLI had taken 68 casualties, German casualties were estimated at 120. However, three strong German formation surrounded the Canadian positions at Villa Rogatti, rendering further exploitation of the bridgehead unlikely. Col. Ware was advised to be ready to withdraw across the Moro River, should German forces counterattack. In order to allow the Canadian Division a greater concentration of force, on the night of 7/8 December, the Indian 21st Infantry Brigade from the Indian 8th Infantry Division amalgamated the western flank of the 1st Canadian Division into their own lines. As a result of the withdrawal, Canadian efforts would focus on achieving a bridgehead at San Leonardo.

=== San Leonardo ===
The Canadian attack on San Leonardo by the Seaforth Highlanders of Canada began late on 5 December 1943 with A Company establishing a bridgehead across the Moro, taking heavy casualties. In the early morning of 6 December, A Company was withdrawn and two additional Seaforth companies resumed the offensive. As PPCLI secured and held their bridgehead over the Moro River, the Seaforth Highlanders were struggling to enter San Leonardo. By 07:15, a single objective had been taken, with Canadian units pinned down by well-coordinated defensive fire from several companies of the 361st Regiment. Simultaneously, small arms fire prevented C Company from moving up the road from the Moro to San Leonardo, while D Company remained on the southern banks of the Moro throughout the early morning.

In the afternoon, having failed to capture San Leonardo, the Hastings and Prince Edward Regiment sent two rifle companies to the aid of the Seaforth Highlanders, as Seaforth B Company attacked positions west of San Leonardo – inflicting 129 casualties on German forces in the area. However, the attack on San Leonardo by three Seaforth companies stalled rapidly when the 26th Panzer Regiment's armoured companies reinforced the sector. As a result, Forin was ordered to prepare for a withdrawal from the San Leonardo bridgehead.

=== San Donato ===
While attempts were made to cross the Moro at San Leonardo and Villa Rogatti, The Hastings and Prince Edward Regiment launched an attack on the Moro River defences at the small coastal hamlet of San Donato at 13:40 on 6 December. However, the single rifle company making the attack achieved little territorial gain and Lieutenant-Colonel Kennedy—commander of the Hastings & Prince Edward Regiment—ordered a withdrawal at 15:40. Throughout 6 December, strong German coastal defences would prevent further advancement, despite the incorporation of tanks and artillery into the assault. By nightfall, the German defenders still possessed control of San Donato, with the Hastings and Prince Edward Regiment withdrawing to the southern bank of the Moro River.

=== Taking the Moro ===
Soldiers of the Seaforth Highlanders of Canada searching German prisoners near the Moro River, 8 December 1943

On 8 December 1943, Major General Vokes devised a new plan for taking the Moro River. While the 48th Highlanders of Canada and Princess Patricia's Canadian Light Infantry resumed the assault on San Leonardo from the southwest side of the town, the Royal Canadian Regiment (RCR) would break out of the bridgehead created by the Hastings and Prince Edward Regiment, then move southwest towards San Leonardo to link up with the 48th and PPCLI. The operation was scheduled to start on the afternoon of 8 December.

The attack began with a massive artillery barrage which pounded German positions continuously for two hours. At 16:00, the Saskatoon Light Infantry support battalion joined in, hitting German positions with bursts of machine gun fire. The moment the heavy bombardment lifted, the 48th Highlanders and the RCR both initiated their attacks. D Company of the 48th Highlanders was able to quickly cross the Moro, taking minimal casualties. However, B Company was subjected to heavy fire from German mortars and 88 mm (3.46 in) artillery positions. Eventually, however, both companies managed to establish strong positions on the western ridge overlooking San Leonardo. During the night of 8/9 December, units of the Royal Canadian Engineers (RCE) constructed a bridge over the Moro, to allow armour and equipment to move into San Leonardo the following day.

As the 48th Highlanders secured their positions west of San Leonardo, the Royal Canadian Regiment was involved in intense fighting southwest of San Donato. Two companies had advanced against strong and well prepared German defences of the 200th Panzergrenadier Regiment. A Company was quickly tied down by German mortar fire, while B Company flanked German positions to the north of San Donato. By nightfall, all four companies held tenuous positions in the thick of German defences. On the night of 8/9 December, the RCR was subjected to counterattacks by the 200th Panzergrenadier Regiment which were repulsed with the support of continuous Canadian artillery shelling.

By the morning of 9 December, the RCE had completed the bridge across the Moro River, enabling the tanks of the 14th Armoured Regiment (Calgary Regiment) to transport two companies of Seaforth Highlanders across the river into San Leonardo. By mid morning, San Leonardo had been cleared of German defenders, although strong positions still existed outside of the town. Within an hour, the Calgarys' tanks had broken through German positions near Sterlen Castle and two companies had linked up with the 48th Highlanders and Princess Patricia's Canadian Light Infantry within San Leonardo, finally establishing firm Canadian positions across the Moro River. Near the end of 9 December, German forces of the 90th Panzergrenadier Division fell back to their second defensive line: a formidable obstacle known as "The Gully".

=== Attacks on Orsogna ===
While Canadian crossed the Moro River, the New Zealand Division launched a two-brigade attack, Operation Torso, against Orsogna at 14:30 on 7 December. The division had the British 2nd Independent Parachute Brigade under their command, anchoring their left flank and were supported by heavy concentrations of artillery and air support. Surprise was achieved as Traugott Herr, the commander of LXXVI Panzer Corps, had been persuaded that the New Zealanders would not be in a position to launch a major attack until 8 December.

Initially, the New Zealand attack progressed well, but the German defenders regained their composure and the attack lost momentum against heavily fortified defensive positions. By 21:00, the NZ 24th Infantry Battalion had fought its way in slow house to house fighting to the centre of the town, but were pinned down with no prospect of further progress without significant armoured support. However, a combination of concealed minefields and well dug in German armour made the task of the Allied tanks impossible. In the early hours of 8 December, the New Zealand commander—Bernard Freyberg—ordered a withdrawal from the town with a view to renewing the attack after further softening up from artillery and bombers.

=== Indian Division across the Moro – the "impossible" bridge ===
With both the Canadian and New Zealand Divisions finding progress difficult, it was decided to bring the Indian 21st Infantry Brigade into the attack with orders to seize Caldari. With no river crossing available, the Indian engineers rushed to build a bridge across the Moro which was completed on 9 December and allowed infantry and supporting armour to cross and expand the bridgehead on the far bank. The bridge was named the "Impossible Bridge" because the local geography required for it to be built backwards from the enemy bank of the river.

=== The Gully ===
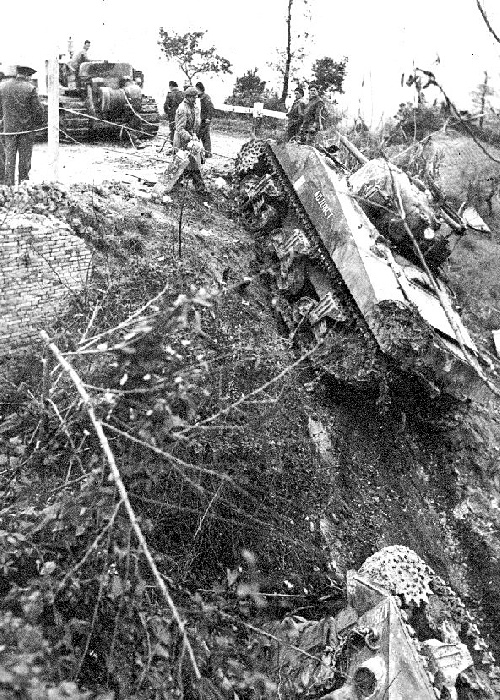
Canadian Sherman driven off the road by German mortar fire, 10 December 1943

Following the loss of San Leonardo and the Moro River, the 90th Panzergrenadier Division withdrew to a primary defensive line 5 km (3.1 mi) north of San Leonardo. The line centred around a natural ravine known as "The Gully", with an average depth of 200 ft (61 m). General Vokes's initial plan to take the position (as well as achieve a foothold on the roads toward Ortona) consisted of a frontal assault by the 2nd Canadian Infantry Brigade, which would seize Vino Ridge, capture The Gully and gain positions on the Ortona to Orsogna road. However, German defences were adequately prepared, including gun-pits, bunkers and shelters.

On 10 December, three Canadian battalions made their first attempt to cross The Gully. Although they succeeded in capturing Vino Ridge, directly south of The Gully, attempts to neutralise German positions in the ravine were unsuccessful. On 11 December, the three battalions made another attempt, with the Loyal Edmonton Regiment suffering heavy casualties in their attempts to take German positions in the sector. Although the badly mauled A Company was able to gain a foothold on the reverse slope, newly arrived German units forced the remaining men to withdraw.

On 12 December 1943, General Vokes sent the three battalions of the 3rd Canadian Infantry Brigade against German defences in The Gully. The assault started poorly, when Canadian artillery plans were captured by soldiers of the 90th Panzergrenadier Division's 200th Regiment. When the West Nova Scotia Regiment attacked The Gully, they were subject to counterattacks by the 200th Panzergrenadier Regiment approximately 10:30. By 14:00, the regiment had called off its attacks and had taken heavy casualties. To the west, Princess Patricia's Canadian Light Infantry fared little better, with C Company taking heavy casualties in their assault. Attempts were again made on 13 December, by two battalions of the 3rd Canadian Infantry Brigade, and the attacks were driven back by tenacious German resistance. On the evening of 13 December, the heavily depleted 90th Panzergrenadier Division were relieved from their positions in The Gully by units of the 1st Parachute Division.

=== Casa Berardi ===
By 14 December, Vokes had devised a new assault plan for taking The Gully. A small force from the Royal 22^{e} Régiment would move to Casa Berardi, a small set of farmhouses west of The Gully, before outflanking German positions with infantry and armour, thereby forcing the 1st Parachute Division to withdraw. The attack was to begin at dawn, with two companies of the Royal 22^{e} Régiment attacking Casa Berardi with artillery support. By 07:50, both companies had control of the lateral highway leading to Casa Berardi. C Company—under Captain Paul Triquet—pushed on toward Casa Berardi with support from the 11th Armoured Regiment (The Ontario Regiment), while D Company found itself involved in firefights southwest of Casa Berardi. At 08:30, C Company began their assault toward the manor house in Casa Berardi, some 2,000 yd (1,800 m) away. Strong German defences caused heavy casualties to the attackers; only 21 men and five tanks made it to within 200 yd (180 m) of the objective. Despite the arrival of several Panzer IVs, Triquet's remaining forces captured the manor house at 14:30. However, only 14 men of C Company remained fit to continue fighting. For his efforts to capture Casa Berardi, Triquet was awarded the Victoria Cross.

=== Eighth Army reorganises to intensify the attack ===
With the Indian Division committed, Montgomery decided to raise the stakes further by bringing the British 5th Infantry Division from the relatively tranquil XIII Corps front in the high mountains on the left wing of the 8th Army and insert them between the New Zealand and Indian Divisions. This would allow the Indian division to narrow and concentrate their attack and give Montgomery four divisions to continue the attack between Orsogna and the sea. By 12 December, the British 17th Infantry Brigade—the first of 5th Division's brigades—was in place and under the New Zealand division's command. Once 5th Division headquarters and its other brigades had arrived, these two left hand divisions were to be organised under the command of XIII Corps, commanded by Lieutenant-General Miles Dempsey.

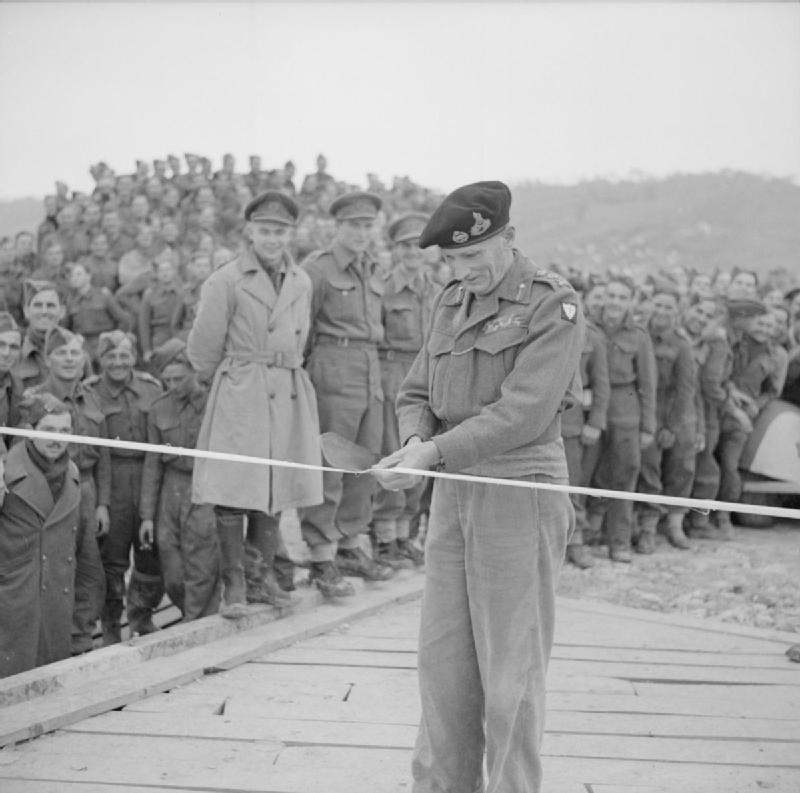
General Montgomery cuts the tape to officially open the Bailey bridge constructed over the Sangro river, 14 December 1943.

To the left of the Canadian division, the Indian 21st Brigade had by 13 December established a solid bridgehead around the "Impossible Bridge". That night, a second 8th Indian Division brigade—the 17th Indian Infantry Brigade—passed through and attacked towards Caldari. The 1st Battalion Royal Fusiliers stormed the village in a wild night's fighting while the 1st Battalion 5th Gurkha Rifles seized Point 198 nearby, holding it against determined counterattacks, including from tanks in the afternoon of 14 December. That evening, 1st Battalion 12th Frontier Force Regiment attacked on the left of the Gurkhas and established positions on the lateral road between Ortona and Orsogna running parallel to the Moro some 1,000 yd (910 m) north of the "Impossible Bridge". On the evening of 15 December, the 1st/5th Battalion Essex Regiment from the Indian Division's 19th Indian Infantry Brigade, which had been held in reserve, was committed on the left flank of the Frontier Force Regiment to advance in the direction of Crecchio and overran a number of German positions. By the end of 16 December, further attacks from the 15th Punjab Regiment's 3rd Battalion had secured positions on the lateral road, ensuring that the 8th Indian Division was firmly embedded in the main German defences.

Meanwhile, at 01:00 on 15 December, the New Zealand Division—electing not to make a further frontal assault on Orsogna—launched their 5th Brigade in Operation Florence, a new flanking attack to the right of the village. By that afternoon, 5th Brigade was well established on the Orsogna to Ortona lateral road and had driven a shallow salient into the German forward defensive line. Although they had exhausted nearly all their reserves, divisional headquarters was optimistic for the prospects for the next day, given the heavy casualties they had inflicted that day.

However, the Germans launched a counterattack at 03:15 on 16 December, throwing in men from the 6th Parachute Regiment, sent by Herr to the 26th Panzer Division to relieve the exhausted 9th Panzergrenadier Regiment. These troops had arrived late that evening after a long journey. Supported by tanks, they attacked the right-hand New Zealand positions held by the 21st NZ Battalion, but were held off and had retired by daylight. Meanwhile, even before the German counterattack had been repelled, the 20th Regiment had attacked toward Orsogna with two squadrons of Sherman tanks. Under intense artillery and anti-tank fire, the tanks and infantry became separated and the tanks became a target rather than a threat.

Operation Florence had come to an end. While the German line had been pushed back and they had sustained casualties they could ill afford, they still firmly held Orsogna. Furthermore, the New Zealand Division was, for the time being, fought out and needed a period of consolidation and reorganisation.

By 16 December, the British 5th Division had completed its move into the line between the New Zealand and the Indian divisions. There followed a period of hostile patrolling and skirmishing on the XIII Corps front. The main burden of the fighting was therefore assumed by V Corps as the Canadians pushed for Ortona with the Indian Division on their left flank attacking toward Villa Grande and Tollo.

=== Taking The Gully ===
In preparation for what he hoped would be the final attack on The Gully, Vokes shifted the 2nd Canadian Infantry Brigade to occupy positions formerly belonging to the 1st Brigade. Vokes planned for an attack by the Carleton and York Regiment to be the last of the frontal assaults against The Gully. Should this attack fail, the 1st Brigade's Seaforth Highlanders and the Royal Canadian Regiment would move through Casa Berardi and outflank German defences, forcing a withdrawal from The Gully.

At 07:30 on 15 December, two companies of the Carleton and York Regiment attacked. After little more than an hour of fighting, however, the Canadians were forced to call the attack off. In the afternoon, the two heavily depleted companies of the Royal 22^{e} Régiment fought off a large German counterattack on Casa Berardi, with the Royal Canadian Horse Artillery firing 5,398 rounds in support of Canadian forces.

On 18 December, Vokes planned what would be the largest assault on The Gully during the campaign. Beginning at 08:00, Canadian artillery would bombard a 900 m (3,000 ft) front, to a depth of 300 m (980 ft). Every five minutes, the barrage would move 100 m (110 yd) forward, continuing to pound German defences in the bombardment area. Less than 100 m behind this barrage, the 48th Highlanders would advance across the Ortona–Orsogna Lateral Road. At the same time, the 8th Indian Division would attack northward toward Crecchio, preventing German reinforcements from reaching The Gully. When the 48th Highlanders reached the Cider Crossroads, the Royal Canadian Regiment would move north, overrunning Cider itself, then advance up the Ortona–Orsogna road. Both battalions would be supported by tanks of the Three Rivers Regiment. At first, the attack went extremely well. However, when the artillery shifted their barrage, the German defences quickly recovered and their machine gun fire devastated the advancing forces. In C Company of the Royal Canadian Regiment, every platoon commander was killed or wounded. The attack was quickly abandoned.

On 20 December, Canadian forces tried again and the Royal Canadian Regiment attacked Cider Crossroads at noon. This time, Vokes was determined that the operation would be successful, with armoured forces of the Three Rivers Regiment moving to the start lines well before 07:00. Due to shortages of fuel and poor weather, H-Hour was postponed until 14:15. When H-Hour came, a powerful creeping barrage supported two companies of the Royal Canadian Regiment eastward. By evening, B Company controlled the Cider Crossroads, having met virtually no resistance in their advance to the objective. However, German forces had already evacuated The Gully, falling back to prepare for a strong defence of Ortona, with elements of the powerful 1st Parachute Division firmly entrenched in the town.

=== Villa Grande ===
On 23 December Montgomery was promoted to command the 21st Army Group in Operation Overlord, the Allied invasion of Normandy. Command of the Eighth Army passed to Lieutenant General Sir Oliver Leese who kept up pressure on the whole front.

The 19th Indian Brigade was ordered to attack Villa Grande and exploit any gains as far as the Arielli river which ran from the mountains through Tollo to the Adriatic. The attack went in at 05:30 on 22 December but failed in desperate fighting. The 1/5th Battalion, Essex Regiment renewed their attack the following morning with more success. After a counterattack by German paratroops had been repulsed at midday, the Essex advanced to mop up the remainder of the village. However, deadly small scale house-to-house battles continued throughout the rest of 23 December and for the next two days as the determined parachute soldiers clung on. To the south of Villa Grande, the 3rd/15th Punjabis had taken Vezzano on 23 December and a continuous brigade line had been established.

On 25 December, reinforcements in the form of 3rd Battalion, 8th Punjab Regiment were brought forward and after a softening up barrage were launched at the east side of Villa Grande. With four battalions now involved (the 5th Battalion, Royal West Kents had by now been tasked on the south east side of the village) supported by tanks, Villa Grande was finally cleared by the end of 26 December. The troops of the 8th Indian Division entered the village to find a shambles. One correspondent described the scene "as though a giant had trodden on a child's box of blocks".

=== XIII Corps attacks Orsogna ===
On 23 December, Lieutenant-General Dempsey's XIII Corps launched a new attack to push back the German line from Orsogna. In the afternoon, the British 5th Infantry Division attacked on the right wing of the Corps front toward the Arielli stream. Their objective was to secure the flank of the 2nd New Zealand Division, which was in turn to attack northwest and west from the salient in order to roll up the Orsogna defences on the Fontegrande plateau from the north.

After the British 5th Infantry Division had pushed from Poggiofiorito they took the town of Arielli and their objectives. The 5th New Zealand Infantry Brigade attacked at 04:00 on 24 December. Despite intensive artillery support (272 guns on a 3,500 yards (3,200 m) front), the tired and understrength New Zealand battalions struggled to make progress. By the afternoon, it had become clear to the New Zealand commander—Bernard Freyberg—that the stubborn defences of the 26th Panzer Division would not be broached. He is reported to have remarked, "It is not a question of further advance, it is a question of holding on to what we have got". The XIII Corps front was effectively deadlocked and settled into a posture of active defence and patrolling.

=== Ortona ===
Throughout the week of 11–18 December, the 1st Parachute Battalion from the German 1st Parachute Division—with supporting units—had prepared strong defences within the Italian coastal town of Ortona. Paratroop engineers and infantry had destroyed much of Ortona itself, turning the streets into a debris-filled maze. Major streets were mined, with demolition charges throughout the main piazza, and booby traps littered the town. German forces had also buried tanks in the rubble, leaving only the turrets exposed.

On 20 December 1943, the under-strength Loyal Edmonton Regiment moved toward Ortona, with the Seaforth Highlanders covering their eastern flank. Throughout the day, they encountered heavy machine gun fire during their attempts to enter Ortona. By nightfall, both battalions held a toehold on the western edge of Ortona, yet had encountered heavy resistance in their attempts to secure it. The following day, D Company of the Loyal Edmonton Regiment launched attacks eastward towards the city centre, but accurate German sniper fire rapidly stalled the advance.

Throughout the remainder of the week, the Battle of Ortona degenerated into a small-scale version of the Battle of Stalingrad, with vicious house-to-house fighting through the narrow streets and debris of Ortona. Over the course of the battle, Canadian forces developed innovative "mouse-holing" tactics, moving between houses to avoid German sniper fire in the open streets. German counterattacks on 24 and 26 December caused significant casualties to Canadian forces in the town. In danger of being outflanked by Allied advances west of Ortona, the 1st Parachute Regiment abandoned the town the following day, leaving Ortona to Canadian forces. Canadian casualties in the fighting for the town approached 650 killed or wounded.

=== End of the offensive ===
The battle continued for a few days after the fall of Ortona. With that town and Villa Grande captured, it looked as if it would require the Eighth Army only to regather itself and strike one more concentrated blow at Orsogna to complete the breaching of the Gustav Line's main Adriatic strongpoints. However, on 31 December, as V Corps probed along the coastal plain towards Pescara, a blizzard enveloped the battlefield. Drifting snow, sleet and biting winds paralysed movement and communications on the ground while cloud ceiling and visibility fell to nil and grounded the airforce. The Canadians managed to advance north from Casa Berardi along a ridge that ran alongside the Riccio River, and reached the coast at Torra Mucchia, to the east of the river mouth, on 4 January but inland Orsogna remained in German hands.

Leese—realising the Eighth Army no longer had the strength or conditions to force its way to Pescara and the Via Valeria to Rome—recommended to General Alexander that the Eighth Army offensive should be halted to which Alexander agreed.

== Aftermath ==
The allies had made gains and had broken into the Gustav Line but the failure to capture Orsogna put an end to the Allied plans of a strong drive up the eastern coast. Rain, flooded rivers, and high casualties, as well as the departure of Montgomery, all put a halt to Allied plans until the spring of 1944.

After the offensive had ended, Alexander ordered aggressive patrolling in order to pin the units of the LXXVI Panzer Corps in the Adriatic sector and prevent Kesselring moving them to reinforce the XIV Panzer Corps front opposite Lieutenant General Mark W. Clark's U.S. Fifth Army where the Allied offensive would continue.

In spite of this, three attempts during the winter of 1943/44 by the Fifth Army to break through into the Liri valley at Cassino failed. The offensive went on till 15 January when slowly some ground was gained and a few hilltops were secured but otherwise the weather and stiffening German resistance meant a breakthrough was unachievable.

As spring approached in 1944, Alexander concentrated his forces in great secrecy by thinning out the Adriatic front and bringing the bulk of Eighth Army's striking power to the Cassino front. The combined attack of his two armies during the fourth and final Battle of Monte Cassino in early May took Kesselring by surprise and led to the Allied capture of the Italian capital of Rome in early June.

== See also ==
- Bernhardt Line – WWII German defensive line in Italy
