= Bernhardt Line =

WWII German defensive line in Italy

Battle for the Bernhardt Line
- Part of the Italian campaign of World War II
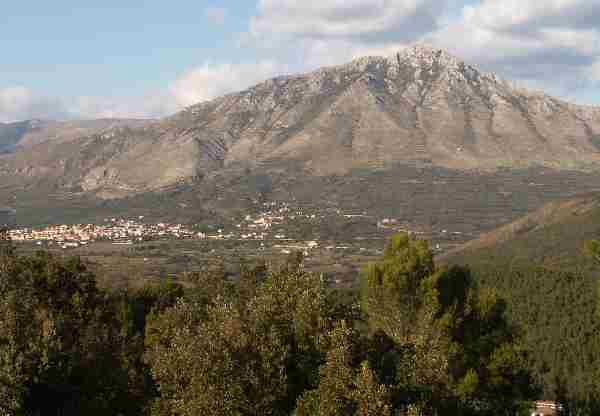
- Mount Sambucaro overlooking the modern town of San Pietro Infine (left) and the ruins of the original town (center).
Date	1 December 1943 – 15 January 1944
Location	Mignano Gap, Kingdom of Italy
Result	Allied victory

Belligerents
United Kingdom: British India; United States; New Zealand; Canada; Free French and others	Germany

Commanders and leaders
(United Kingdom) Harold Alexander (United Kingdom) Bernard Montgomery (United Kingdom) Oliver Leese (United States) Mark Clark	(Nazi Germany) Albert Kesselring (Nazi Germany) Heinrich von Vietinghoff (Note: Von Vietinghof went to Germany on sick leave in late November, and Lemelsen commanded the Tenth Army during the major actions on the Bernhardt Line in December. Von Vietinghof returned in early January) (Nazi Germany) Joachim Lemelsen

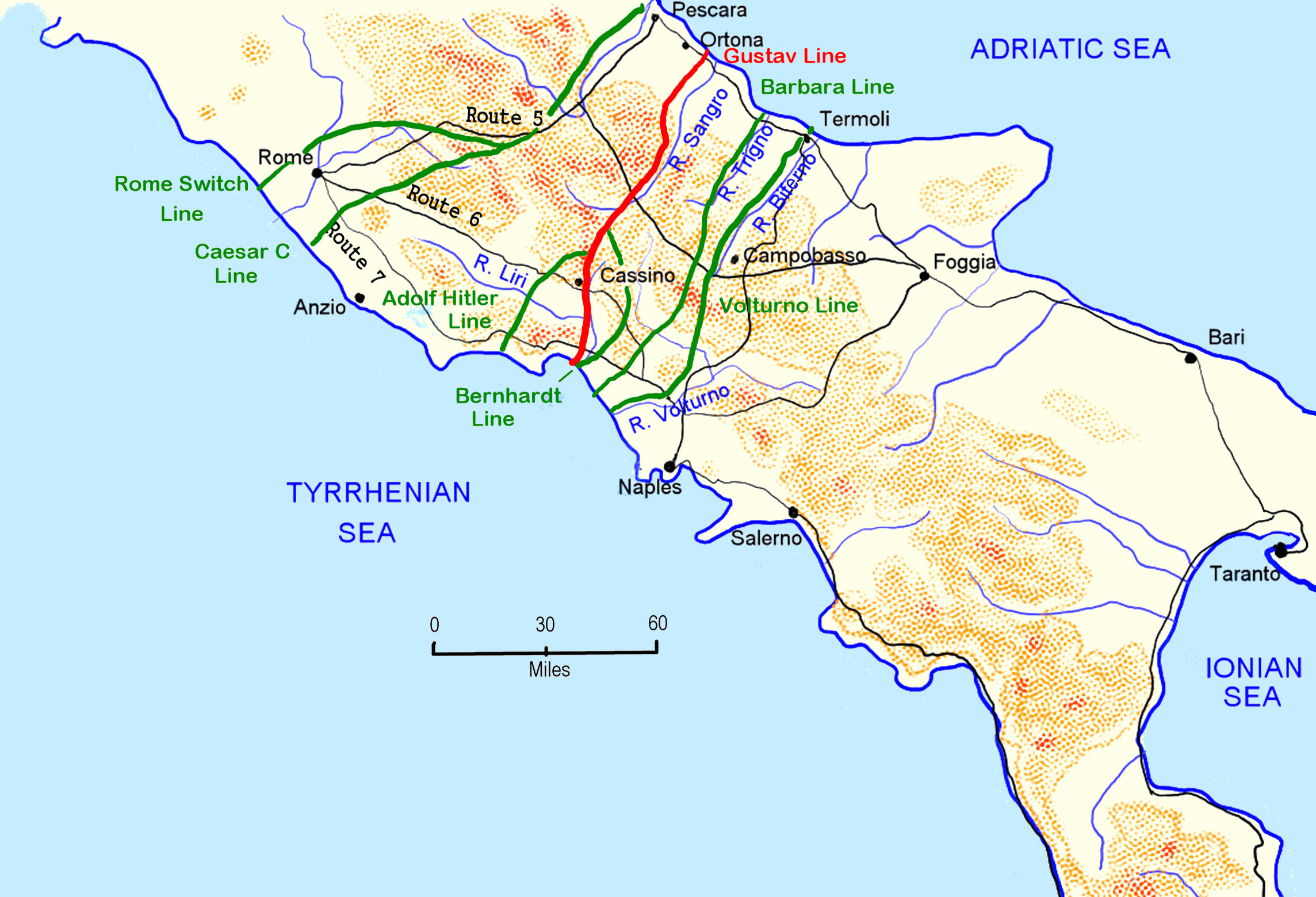
German-prepared defensive lines south of Rome

The Bernhardt Line, or Reinhard or Bernhard Line, was a German Army defensive line in Italy during the Italian Campaign of World War II. (Note: The name Bernhardt Line first appeared in Field-Marshal Alexander's 1950 despatch. The name Reinhard Line first appeared in Field-Marshal Kesselring's 1953 memoir, which he wrote while in prison and without access to records. General Frido von Senger und Etterlin, who commanded the corps defending it, called it the Bernhard Line in his 1964 memoir, as did the 1969 US official history.) Having reached the Bernhardt Line at the start of December 1943, it took until mid-January 1944 for the US Fifth Army to fight its way to the next line of defences, the Gustav Line. The Bernhardt Line was defended by XIV Panzer Corps (XIV Panzerkorps), part of the German Tenth Army (10. Armee).

Unlike most of the other defensive lines, the Bernhardt Line did not run all the way across Italy but was merely a bulge in front of the main Gustav Line; ran over the massif of Monte Cassino; and enclosed the peaks of Monte Cassino (Monastery Hill), Monte la Difensa, Monte la Remetanea and Monte Maggiore, in the territory of Rocca d'Evandro, and Monte Sambucaro (or Sammucro), which stands at the border of the three regions (Lazio, Molise, and Campania). However, the defences of the Gustav Line on the Adriatic are sometimes referred to as the Bernhardt Line, and the battles for that part of the line are included in this entry.

The Bernhardt Line was not as strong as the Gustav Line and was intended only to delay the Allies until at least the middle of December. Together with the Gustav Line and the Hitler Line, it made up the German Winter Line defences.

== Background ==
Following the Allied invasion of Italy in September 1943, the Italian government had surrendered, but the German Army continued to fight. The Allied 15th Army Group, commanded by General Sir Harold Alexander, conquered southern Italy but by early October it had come up against the Volturno Line, the first of two lines (the next being the Barbara Line) used to delay the Allied advance and buy time to prepare the formidable Winter Line. The Germans intended to hold the Volturno Line until at least 15 October and the Barbara Line until at least 15 November. Alexander had three possible alternatives to reach the Italian capital of Rome. On the Adriatic Front, he could advance to Pescara and then use Highway 5 (the old Roman Via Valeria) which traversed the country to Rome on the other coast. Alternatively, on the other side of the Apennines, Highway 7 (the old Roman Appian Way) followed along the west coast but south of Rome ran into the Pontine Marshes, which the Germans had flooded. Finally, Highway 6 ran in the same direction, but further inland, through the Liri Valley.

=== Order of battle ===
The German forces in Italy were commanded by Field Marshal (Generalfeldmarschall) Albert Kesselring. The defence of the Winter Line was the task of the German 10th Army (10. Armee) under the temporary command of Lieutenant-General (General der Panzertruppe) Joachim Lemelsen (in the absence of General (Generaloberst) Heinrich von Vietinghoff, who was in Germany on sick leave). The German 10th Army had Traugott Herr's LXXVI Panzer Corps (LXXVI Panzerkorps) deployed on the eastern side of Italy, from the Apennine Mountains to the Adriatic, and Frido von Senger und Etterlin's XIV Panzer Corps (XIV Panzerkorps) on the western side, from the mountains to the Tyrrhenian Sea.

The new Supreme Allied Commander of the Mediterranean Theater of Operations (MTO) was General Sir Henry Maitland Wilson, replacing General Dwight D. Eisenhower, who had moved to command of the Allied forces preparing for Operation Overlord, the Allied invasion of Normandy. The Allied Armies in Italy (AAI), formerly designated the 15th Army Group, were commanded by General Alexander. Under his command were two field armies. To the left, on the western side of Italy, was the US Fifth Army, commanded by Lieutenant General Mark W. Clark. To the right, on the eastern side, was the British Eighth Army, commanded by General Sir Bernard Montgomery. The Fifth Army consisted of American, British and French units. The Eighth Army, with British, Indian, New Zealand, Canadian and Polish units, was from early January 1944 commanded by Lieutenant-General Sir Oliver Leese after General Montgomery was, along with General Eisenhower, also recalled to England to prepare for Operation Overlord.

== Eighth Army on Adriatic Winter Line defences ==
=== Prelude ===
On 3 October, a battalion of the British Eighth Army's 78th Infantry Division had crossed the Biferno river to confront the German Volturno-Viktor Line defences. Two Commando battalions landed from the sea north of the river at Termoli, and a fiercely contested battle ensued which had hung in the balance when a ford became unusable after heavy rains and prevented Allied armour from moving forward. However, the British infantry reinforced from the sea by two brigades, had held out long enough against the tanks of 16th Panzer Division (16. Panzerdivision) for a Bailey bridge to be laid across the river, and the crisis passed with the arrival of elements of 1st Canadian Armoured Brigade. By 6 October, the Germans were withdrawing to new defensive positions behind the Trigno River, the "Barbara Line".

At the Trigno, the Eighth Army were obliged to pause because it had outrun its supply chain which stretched back over poor roads to the main ports of Bari and Taranto, 120 and 170 miles (190 and 270 km) to its rear. Port and transport capacity had also been affected by the logistic requirements of the Allied air force, which was establishing a large number of strategic bomber bases around Foggia.

The Eighth Army attacked across the Trigno on 2 November. By the next day, the Germans' position had been turned, and they commenced a fighting withdrawal to the forward Winter Line positions that they were preparing on the ridges behind the Sangro River.

=== Advance across the Sangro ===

The Eighth Army's forward units had reached the Sangro on 9 November. Alexander had planned for Montgomery to strike across the river on its coastal plain on 20 November with the V Corps (Indian 8th Infantry and 78th Infantry Divisions). In secrecy, Montgomery shifted the Indian division to the right to narrow the V Corps front and concentrate its power, bringing the newly arrived 2nd New Zealand Division into the gap. Eighth Army also devised a deception scheme involving false troop movements and ammunition dumps to give the impression that the main attack would be through the British XIII Corps front. The deception was to be maintained by an earlier diversionary attack some 40 miles (64 km) inland by XIII Corps and a secondary attack at the same time as V Corps some 15 miles (24 km) inland by the New Zealanders.

However, Kesselring guessed the Allies' intentions. On 18 November, Lemelsen had signaled Kesselring to the effect that the Allied concentrations on the coast led him to expect the main attack on his left wing. Then, heavy rain raised the river levels, which caused the postponement of the offensive to the night of 27 November and giving the Germans time to switch two divisions across the Apennines to the defending LXXVI Panzer Corps. That made three divisions on the coastal plain opposing V Corps: 65th Infantry Division (65. Infantriedivision), 90th Panzergrenadier Division (90. Panzergrenadierdivision) and 26th Panzer Division (26. Panzerdivision). 16th Panzer Division opposed the New Zealanders and the German 1st Parachute Division (1. Fallschirmjägerdivision) faced XIII Corps (1st Canadian Division and British 5th Infantry Division).

In the early hours of 28 November, the Eighth Army attack went in supported by heavy artillery concentrations. The New Zealanders advanced steadily. Although the German defences had been well prepared, most of the New Zealanders' objectives were manned by 65th Division which was poorly equipped and untried in battle. The German Division was also hampered by the fact that its commander, Brigadier-General (Generalmajor) G.H. von Ziehlberg, was severely wounded on the afternoon of 28 November. The 8th Indian Division, however, like the New Zealanders facing their first major combat action since arriving in Italy, experienced tougher opposition. Elements of 65th Infantry Division supported by an armoured battle group held tenaciously on to Mezzagrogna and the town was eventually taken on 29 November after tough, often hand to hand, fighting. On the morning of 29 November, 78th Infantry Division had joined the attack on the right of the Indian Division and had forced their way to Santa Maria by the evening, which created a base for their main attack the following day towards Fossacesia. By late on 30 November, 78th Division, supported by 4th Armoured Brigade, had taken Fossacesia and the whole ridge on the far bank of the Sangro. The main Bernhardt defences were under Eighth Army control.

As the Eighth Army pushed forward over the next few days, the 65th Infantry Division crumbled to the extent that German 10th Army were later to order a court-martial into its conduct. However, Herr introduced 90th Panzergrenadier Division into the line from his reserve and transferred reinforcements from the quieter sector inland in the form of elements of 1st Parachute Division. The complications of those manoeuvres introduced considerable confusion within the Germans' alignment, but they still managed a fighting withdrawal to the ridge on the far side of the Moro River. Unaware of the disorganisation in the German ranks, the New Zealanders failed on 2 December to exploit an opportunity to capture Orsogna, a key position near the headwaters of the Moro, which on that day was still only lightly held. It was only on the morning of 3 December that the New Zealand Division disputed possession of Orsogna, but the 26th Panzer had just enough breathing space to organise and repelled it. The 26th Panzer then proceeded to create a formidable defensive complex around the town and along the ridge towards Ortona on the coast, and Orsogna was not occupied by the Allies, despite a further two determined attempts during December, until the Germans withdrew after the Allied breakthrough at Monte Cassino in May 1944.

=== Moro offensive ===
Montgomery now rested the tired 78th Division, which had been leading the V Corps advance since the Volturno Line offensive, and swapped it with the 1st Canadian Infantry Division from the relatively quiet XIII Corps sector. The Canadians, with the 8th Indian Infantry Division on their left, led the main thrust across the Moro on 8 December aiming for Ortona. By 20 December, after a stubborn resistance first from elements of the German 90th Panzergrenadier Division and then elements of the 1st Parachute Division, which had relieved the Panzergrenadier Division, the Canadians had patrols on the outskirts of the town. However, the Battle of Ortona took another week of fierce house-to-house fighting as the German 3rd Parachute Regiment tenaciously held on before it withdrew to the other side of the Riccio River on 28 December.

Meanwhile, inland of V Corps, XIII Corps (spearheaded by the 2nd New Zealand Division) assaulted Orsogna three times but could not get past the defending 26th Panzer Division. Eighth Army's offensive on the Adriatic front then ground to a halt. Between 28 November and 31 December it had advanced only 14 miles (23 km) and sustained 6,500 casualties. The continued strong resistance of the Germans, worsening weather, and jagged terrain convinced Montgomery that Eighth Army did not have the strength to force its way to Pescara and then cross the peninsula to Rome. Alexander called a halt to the offensive and instructed Montgomery to maintain sufficient activity to pin LXXVI Panzer Corps and prevent troops from being sent across to reinforce XIV Corps facing the Fifth Army.

The rest of the winter on the Adriatic front was spent in bitterly uncomfortable conditions with the opposing sides often in close proximity and engaged in night-time patrolling and vicious skirmishing.

== Fifth Army Bernhardt Line offensive ==
It had taken Lieutenant General Mark Clark's Fifth Army from mid-October to early November to fight their way from the Volturno Line positions to the Bernhardt Line. They had faced difficult terrain and determined rearguard defences in deteriorating weather as the torrential autumn rains broke.

In the centre of the Fifth Army front lay the Mignano Gap, through which passed Highway 6 on its way to the Liri Valley and thence to Rome. Highway 6 was considered the best axis of advance because the Liri Valley was good tank country, while Highway 7 on the west coast offered only a narrow coastal plain and ran through the flooded Pontine Marshes.

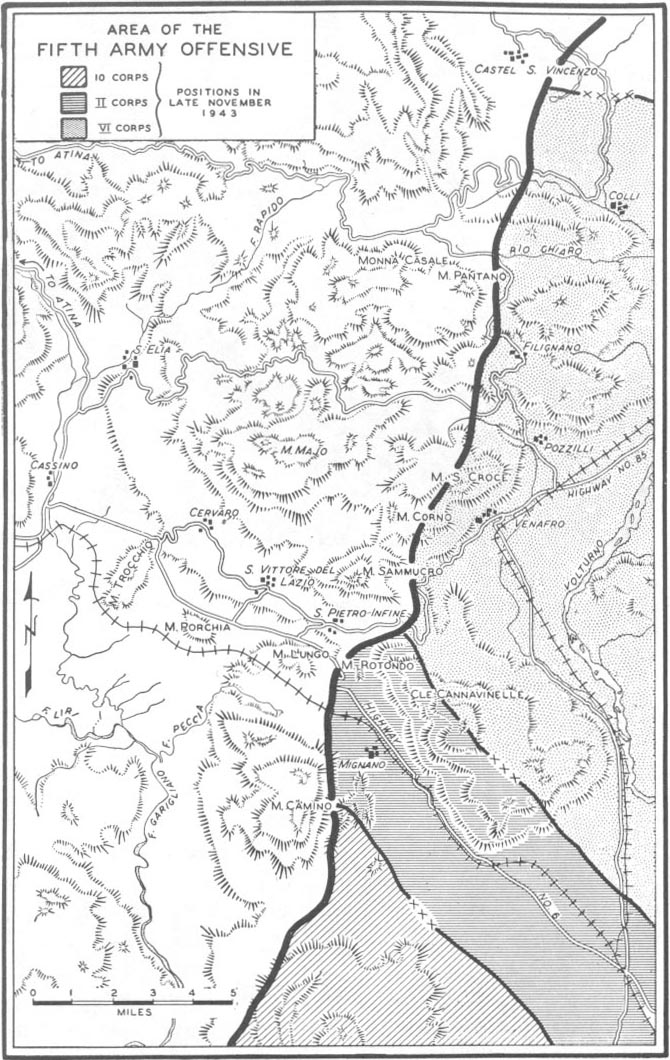
Area of the Fifth Army offensive in the autumn of 1943.

Flanking and overlooking Highway 6 through the Mignano Gap and its villages (San Pietro Infine, San Vittore Del Lazio and Cervaro) are, successively, Monte Camino, Monte Lungo, Monte Porchia and Monte Trocchio on the left and Monte San Croce, Monte Corno, Monte Sambúcaro (Note: This name usually appears as "Sammucro" on Allied military maps of the period.) and Monte Maio on the right. Monte Sambúcaro normally appears as Monte Sammucro on Allied maps of the time. On 6 November, the 201st Guards Brigade, which was attached to the 56th (London) Infantry Division, part of Lieutenant-General Sir Richard McCreery's British X Corps, attacked Monte Camino but was repulsed by the 15th Panzergrenadier Division (15. Panzergrenadierdivision) and took 600 casualties. By mid-November, it was clear that after having sustained 10,000 combat casualties since the Volturno Line offensive, the Fifth Army needed to pause, reorganise and regather its strength.

The Fifth Army resumed its attack on 1 December. After an intensive artillery and air bombardment, the first attack against the formidable Camino hill mass, Operation Raincoat, was delivered by the British X Corps on the left (comprising the 46th and 56th Infantry Divisions) and elements of the U.S. II Corps on the right, commanded by Major General Geoffrey Keyes and including the 1st Special Service Force under Lieutenant Colonel Robert T. Frederick. The dominating peak on Monte Camino, Hill 963, is crowned by a monastery. Two slightly lower peaks, Monte la Difensa (Hill 960) and Monte la Remetanea (Hill 907), lie less than two miles (3.2 km) north of Camino. At the upper end of the Camino feature are the numerous peaks of Monte Maggiore. The entire hill mass is about six miles (9.7 km) long and four miles (6.4 km) wide. On the east and northeast, and the slopes rise steeply to the heights and then fall away gradually to the west toward the Garigliano River. It took until 9 December before the Camino mass was secured from the 15th Panzergrenadier Division.

Meanwhile, on the Fifth Army's right flank, the US VI Corps, commanded by Major General John P. Lucas and composed of the 34th and 45th Infantry Divisions, had attacked into the mountains but made little progress until reinforced by the mountain troops of the French Expeditionary Corps (CEF), recently arrived in Italy. They attacked again on 15 December.

On 8 December the US 36th Infantry Division and 3rd Ranger Battalion of II Corps launched the attack on Monte Sambúcaro and into the Mignano Gap. By the night of 10 December, the peaks had been taken, which threatened the German positions in the gap. However, the German positions at San Pietro in the valley held firm until 16 December, when an attack launched from the Camino mass took Monte Lungo. The Germans could no longer expect to hold San Pietro when the dominating ground on both flanks, Monte Lungo and the Sambúcaro peaks, was in II Corps' possession. Under the cover of a counterattack, the German forces withdrew to positions about one mile (1.6 km) to their rear, in front of San Vittore. Several attacks were made in the next few days, and Morello Hill, overlooking the San Vittore positions from the north, was captured on 26 December.

On the US VI Corps front, progress was made but proved very difficult over the mountainous terrain as the weather deteriorated further with the onset of winter. In December, the Fifth Army suffered 5,020 wounded, but total admissions to hospital totaled 22,816, with jaundice, fevers and trench foot prevalent.

At the end of December, the Fifth Army had to pause once again to reorganise, replace its losses and gather itself for a final push to reach the Gustav Line defences. The US VI Corps was taken into reserve to train and prepare for the Anzio landings (codenamed Operation Shingle) with the French troops, by this time at corps strength, taking over their front.

The II Corps returned to the attack on 4 January 1944, with attacks parallel to Highway 6 north and south of it. The northern attack took San Vittore, and by 7 January the overlooking height of La Chiaia. On the south side, the attack was made from Monte Lungo and captured Monte Porchia. Meanwhile, on their left, the British X Corps had attacked from positions on the Camino mass to take on 8 January Cedro Hill, which with Monte Chiaia and Monte Porchia had formed a strong defensive line in front of Monte Trocchio.

The last offensive to clear the enemy in front of the Gustav defences started on 10 January. Cervaro was taken on 12 January and the overlooking hills to the north on 13 January. That opened up the northern flank of Monte Trocchio, and a heavy assault was planned for 15 January. However, the German XIV Panzer Corps considered the position to be untenable and withdrew across the Rapido. When the II Corps moved forward on 15 January, it encountered no resistance.

== Air battle ==
Even with the MAAF (Mediterranean Allied Air Forces) order going into effect on 20 December, the actions were the same as the days before. It would be on 1 January that operations would grind to a halt because of the official command changes. From 17 December to 15 January, the Allies also suffered very few scrubbed missions because of great weather, which permitted missions, unlike from November to December, when several days prevented any operational sorties by any air forces of the Allied forces.

From 17 December to 15 January, the period between the interdiction of the Bernhardt Line, allowed for an in-depth analysis for interdiction. The major targets included Rome, Pescara, Civitavecchia, Arezzo and Cassino. The area around Rome was often targeted by fighter bombers of the USAAF and RAF, and the towns of Arezzo and Civitavecchia, as well as the gun positions around the town, were also targeted by those fighter bombers. However, the railways in and around Pescara were targeted by Mediterranean Allied Tactical Air Force (MATAF) light and medium bombers. They were highly effective in damaging the marshalling yards and railways.

At Cassino, both fighter bombers and medium bombers attacked and often tried to soften up the defences. That was especially common as the Fifth US Army approached the Rapido River near Cassino in early January to prepare for the first attack. Also, gun positions in the Mignano Gap and German troops on Mount Trocchio were also targeted on a handful of missions. Notably, the harbor facilities at Anzio were attacked as well.

Unofficially, Operation Strangle would begin on 15 January as the Bernhardt Line fell as a major air interdiction campaign. The MATAF took advantage of the moment to harass the retreating Germans by attacking them directly and also by severing their supply line in the world’s first major and intentional air interdiction campaign. The planning for Operation Strangle ensured that it would be delayed as the mechanics of air interdiction could be studied, and units prepared and used to that form of combat.

== Aftermath ==
It had taken the Fifth Army six weeks of intense combat and 16,000 casualties to advance the 7 miles (11 km) through the Bernhardt Line defences, including the action at San Pietro Infine, to take Monte Trocchio and to reach the positions facing the main Gustav defences on 15 January.

== See also ==
- 36th Infantry Division (United States) – US Army National Guard formation
- Allied invasion of Italy – 1943 military campaign of World War II
- Barbara Line – WW2 German military fortifications in Italy
- Battle of San Pietro Infine – WWII major engagement from 8–17 December 1943, in the Italian Campaign
- United States Army North – Theater Army of the U.S. Army
- Winter Line – Series of German military fortifications in Italy

== Sources ==
- Alexander, Harold (1950). The Allied Armies in Italy from 3rd September, 1943, to 12th December, 1944. London Gazette.
- Blumenson, Martin (1969). Salerno to Cassino. Washington D.C.: Center of Military History, United States Army.
- Böhmler, Rudolf (2020) [1964]. Monte Cassino: A German View. Barnsley, UK: Pen & Sword Military. ISBN 978-1-52678-161-1.
- Carver, Field Marshal Lord (2002) [2001]. The Imperial War Museum Book of the War in Italy 1943-1945. London: Sidgwick & Jackson. ISBN 0-330-48230-0.
- Clark, Lloyd (2006). Anzio: The Friction of War. Italy and the Battle for Rome 1944. Headline Publishing Group, London. ISBN 978-0-7553-1420-1.
- Fifth Army Historical Section (1990) [1945]. Fifth Army at the Winter Line (15 November 1943-15 January 1944). American Forces in Action series. Washington: United States Army Center of Military History. CMH Pub 100-9. Archived from the original on 21 November 2012.
- Fifth Army Historical Section (1990) [1945]. From the Volturno to the Winter Line 6 October-15 November 1943. CMH Online bookshelves: American Forces in Action series. Washington: United States Army Center of Military History. ISBN 0-16-001999-0. CMH Pub 100-8.
- Ford, Ken (2003) [1999]. Battleaxe Division. Stroud, Gloucestershire: Sutton. ISBN 0-7509-1893-4.
- Hoyt, Edwin P. (2007) [2002]. Backwater War. The Allied Campaign in Italy, 1943-45. Mechanicsburg, PA: Stackpole. ISBN 978-0-8117-3382-3.
- Kesselring, Albert (1989) [1953]. The Memoirs of Field-Marshal Kesselring. Novato: Presidio. ISBN 0-89141-353-7.
- Muhm, Gerhard. "German Tactics in the Italian Campaign". Archived from the original on 22 September 2013.
- Muhm, Gerhard (1993). La Tattica tedesca nella Campagna d'Italia, in Linea Gotica avanposto dei Balcani (in Italian). Roma: (Hrsg.) Amedeo Montemaggi - Edizioni Civitas.
- Nicholson, G.W.L. (1956). Official history of the Canadian Army in the Second World War, Vol II The Canadians in Italy, 1943-1945. Ottawa: Queen's Printer.
- Phillips, N.C. (1957). Italy Volume I: The Sangro to Cassino. The Official History of New Zealand in the Second World War 1939–1945. Wellington: Historical Publications Branch, republished by the NZETC.
- Von Senger und Etterlin, Frido (1964). Neither Fear Nor Hope. New York: E. P. Dutton & Co.
- Smith, Col. Kenneth V. (c. 1990). Naples-Foggia 9 September 1943-21 January 1944. CMH Online bookshelves: World War II Campaigns. Washington: United States Army Center of Military History. CMH Pub 72-17. Archived from the original on 6 September 2016.
