= Moro (Italian river) =

Location
- Country: Italy

Physical characteristics
- Mouth: Adriatic Sea
  - coordinates: 42.3286°N 14.4246°E

The Moro is a river in Italy. It is located in the province of Chieti in the Abruzzo region of southern Italy. Its source is located near Guardiagrele. The river flows northeast past Orsogna and Lanciano before flowing into the Adriatic Sea near San Vito Chietino. During the Italian campaign, the Allied Eighth Army fought the German 10th Army in the vicinity of the Moro in December 1943.
