= Barbara Line =

WW2 German military fortifications in Italy

Battle for the Barbara Line
- Part of the Italian campaign of World War II
Date	1–9 November 1943
Location	From Colli a Volturno to San Salvo Italy
Result	Allied victory

Belligerents
United Kingdom: British India; United States	Germany

Commanders and leaders
(United Kingdom) Harold Alexander (United Kingdom) Bernard Montgomery (United Kingdom) Oliver Leese (United States) Mark Clark	(Nazi Germany) Albert Kesselring

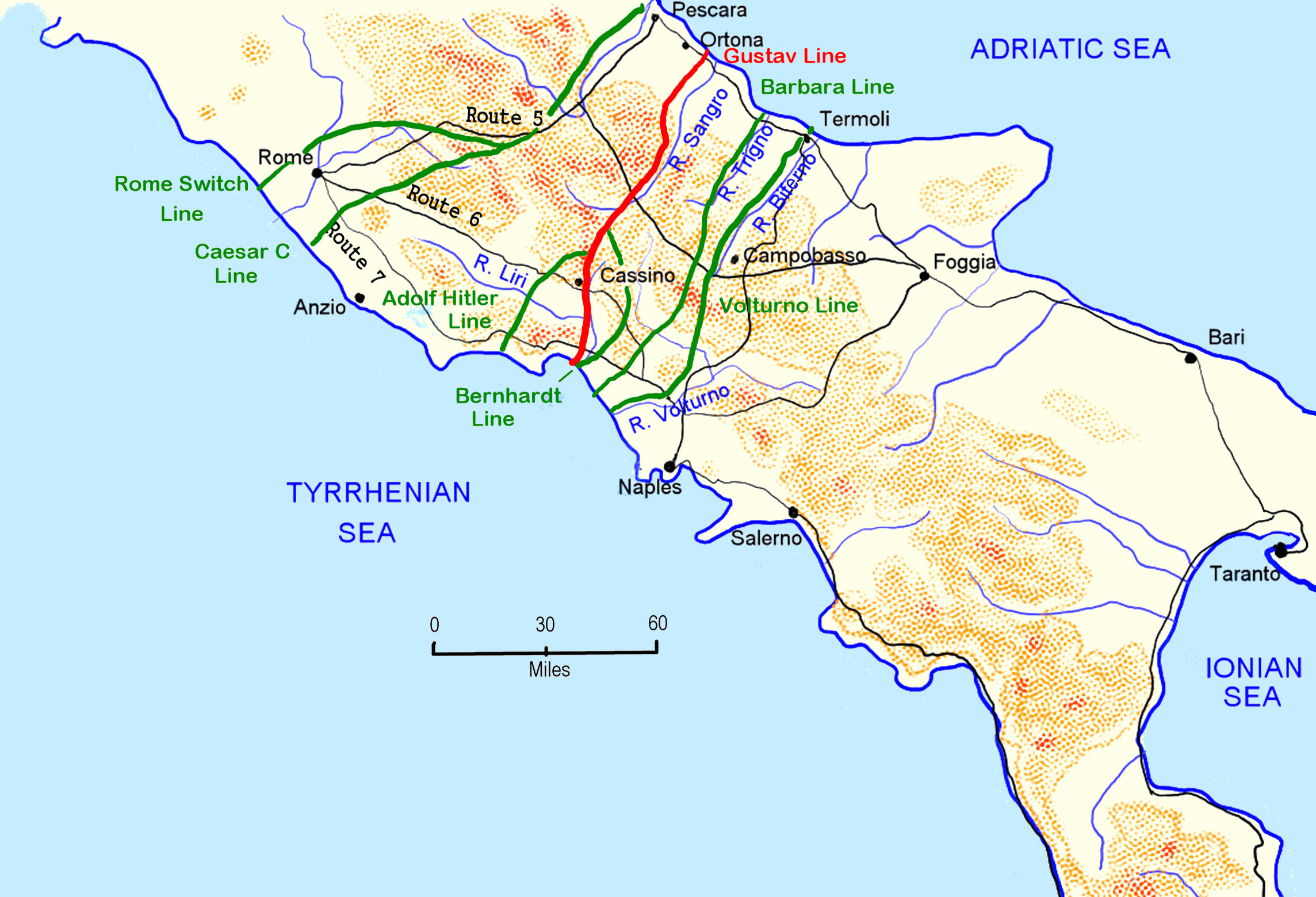
German prepared defensive lines south of Rome.

During the Italian Campaign of World War II, the Barbara Line was a series of German military fortifications in Italy, some 10–20 mi (16–32 km) south of the Gustav Line, from Colli al Volturno to the Adriatic Coast in San Salvo and a similar distance north of the Volturno Line. Near the eastern coast, it ran along the line of the Trigno river. The line mostly consisted of fortified hilltop positions. The line was broken by the allied army in November 1943 following which the Axis forces withdrew to the defensible positions of the Winter Line.

== Western breakthrough (U.S. Fifth Army front) ==
Generalfeldmarschall (Field marshal) Albert Kesselring—German commander-in-chief Italy—ordered his forces to retreat to the Barbara Line on 12 October 1943 after the U.S. Fifth Army crossed the Volturno River, breaching the Volturno defensive line.

By early November the Barbara Line on the Tyrrhenian Sea side of the Apennine Mountains had been breached by the U.S. Fifth Army, and the German Forces fell back to the Bernhardt Line.

== Eastern breakthrough (British Eighth Army front) ==
The Allied Armies in Italy under General Sir Harold Alexander were fighting their way northward in Italy against determined German opposition skillfully directed by Albert Kesselring whose forces had prepared a succession of defensive lines. On the Adriatic front east of the Apennine Mountain spine was the British Eighth Army under General Bernard Montgomery. In October Eighth Army had crossed the Biferno river and the British Eighth Army had broken the Viktor/Volturno Line defences on 6 October. However, they had had to pause at the Trigno to re-group and reorganise their logistics along the poor roads stretching back to Bari and Taranto 120 mi (190 km) and 170 mi (270 km) respectively to the rear of the front. Delayed by these logistical problems, the Allies were not able to attack the next line of defences (the Barbara Line) behind the Trigno river immediately. It therefore was not until the early hours of 2 November that the V Corps on the right of the front on the coast and XIII Corps on their left attacked across the Trigno river.

On the V Corps front, British 78th Infantry Division attacked along the coastal road while 8th Indian Infantry Division attacked some 10 mi (16 km) inland. Fighting was fierce, but on 3 November, British 78th Division reached San Salvo, some three miles beyond the Trigno, at which point Generalmajor Rudolf Sieckenius—commanding 16th Panzer Division—decided to make a fighting withdrawal to the Sangro river and the formidable Gustav defensive positions overlooking the river from the ridge tops on the far side. Forward elements of Eighth Army moved to make contact with the forward defenses of the German Winter Line on the high ground north of the Sangro River. The Allies were able to move forward without opposition and the Allied advance reached the Sangro on 9 November.

== See also ==
- Allied invasion of Italy
- Italian Campaign
- British Eighth Army
- U.S. Fifth Army
- Volturno Line
- Bernhardt Line
- Battle of San Pietro Infine
- Gustav Line
- Gothic Line
