= Volturno Line =

WW2 German defensive line in Italy

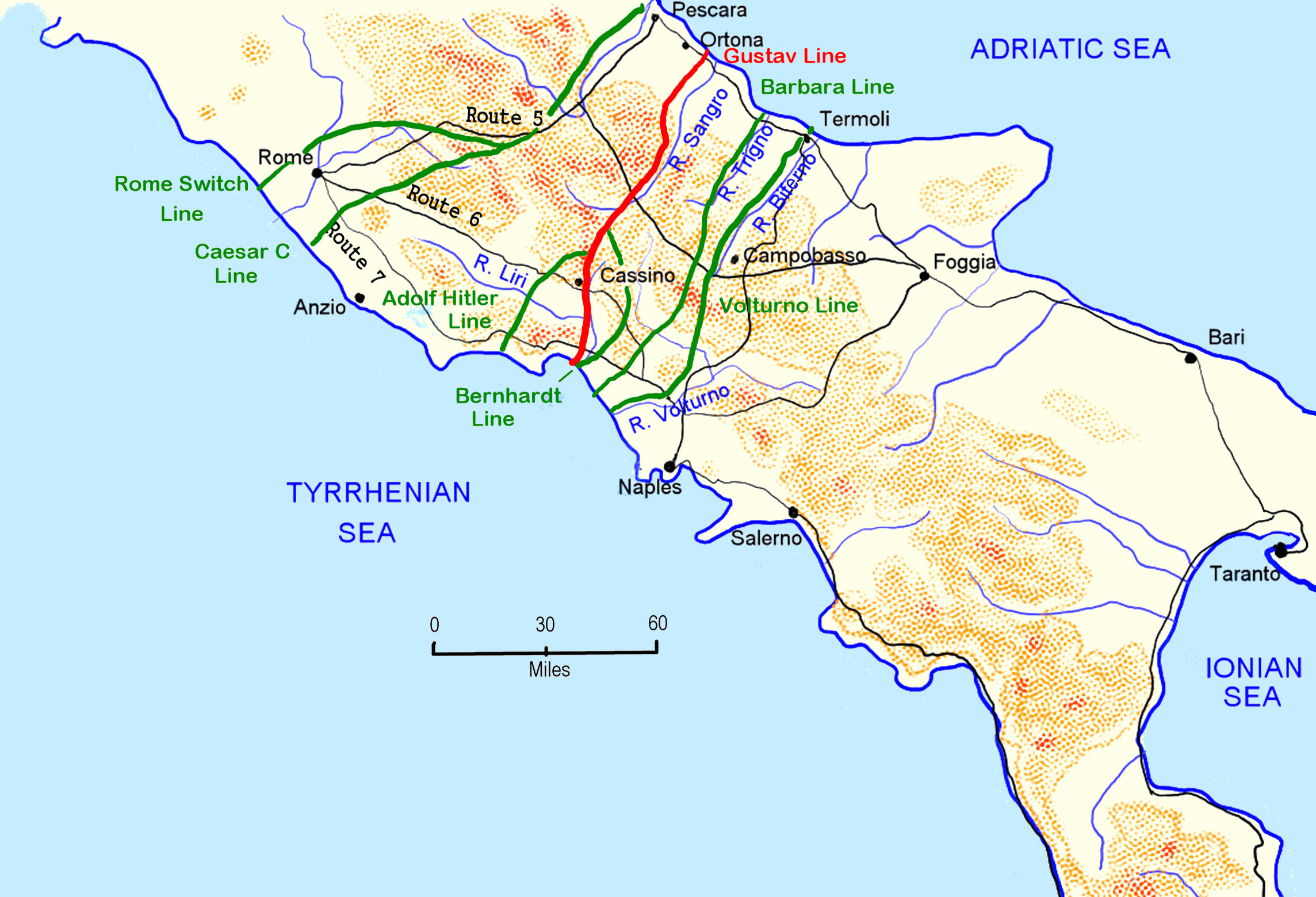
German prepared defensive lines south of Rome

The Volturno Line (also known as the Viktor Line; German: Volturno-Linie, Viktor-Linie, Italian: Linea del Volturno) was a German defensive position in Italy during the Italian Campaign of World War II.

The line ran from Termoli in the east, along the Biferno River through the Apennine Mountains to the Volturno River in the west.

Following the Allied invasion of Italy in September 1943 the German forces set up a series of defensive lines across Italy, intended to delay the Allied advance. The Volturno Line was the southernmost of these.

== Eighth Army on the River Biferno (Battle of Termoli) ==
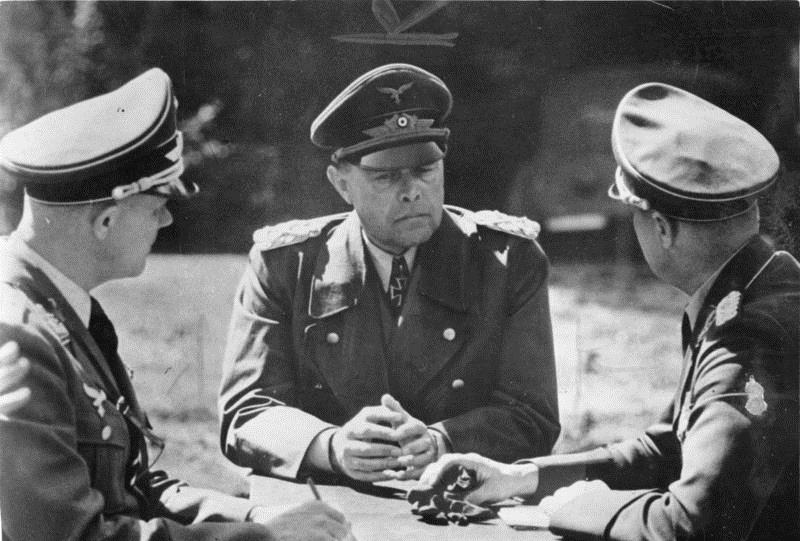
German supreme commander in Italy—Generalfeldmarshall Albert Kesselring (1940).

As a response to the increasing Allied pressure on the Adriatic front, on October 1 the German supreme commander in Italy—Generalfeldmarshall Albert Kesselring—ordered the 16th Panzer Division to switch to the Adriatic front. Elements of the British 78th Infantry Division's 11th Brigade infantry crossed the Biferno at dawn on 3 October 1943 following an amphibious landing at Termoli by British Commandos at 02:15. By late morning, the two elements had linked up and that night 78th Division's 36th Brigade were able to be landed by sea at Termoli. However, logistical problems had prevented the Allies building a heavy duty bridge across the Biferno and when the bulldozed fords were made unusable after 5 tanks had crossed, there was no way to get more tanks across the river to support the infantry. A lighter weight FBE bridge was built to allow artillery, reconnaissance, and other vehicles to cross. The move east of 16th Panzer Division presented a major and unforeseen threat to the unsupported Allied infantry. As news of the German armour's arrival came in on 4 October, 78th Division's commander— Major-General Vyvyan Evelegh—demanded priority from British Eighth Army, under General Bernard Montgomery, for bridging equipment. As more German armour arrived, the Allied troops across the Biferno were forced onto the defensive. By the afternoon of 5 October, they had been squeezed back to within .5 mi (0.80 km) of Termoli. However, at the same time frantic round the clock efforts by engineers had resulted in a heavyweight Bailey bridge being completed, allowing Canadian and British armour to cross the Biferno. That evening, 78th Division's 38th (Irish) Brigade arrived by sea at Termoli and the German attack the following morning was narrowly repulsed in desperate fighting. By late morning on 6 October, the Allies were on the attack and by late afternoon the Germans had started to fall back to the next prepared defences on the River Trigno, the Barbara Line.

== Fifth Army on the River Volturno ==
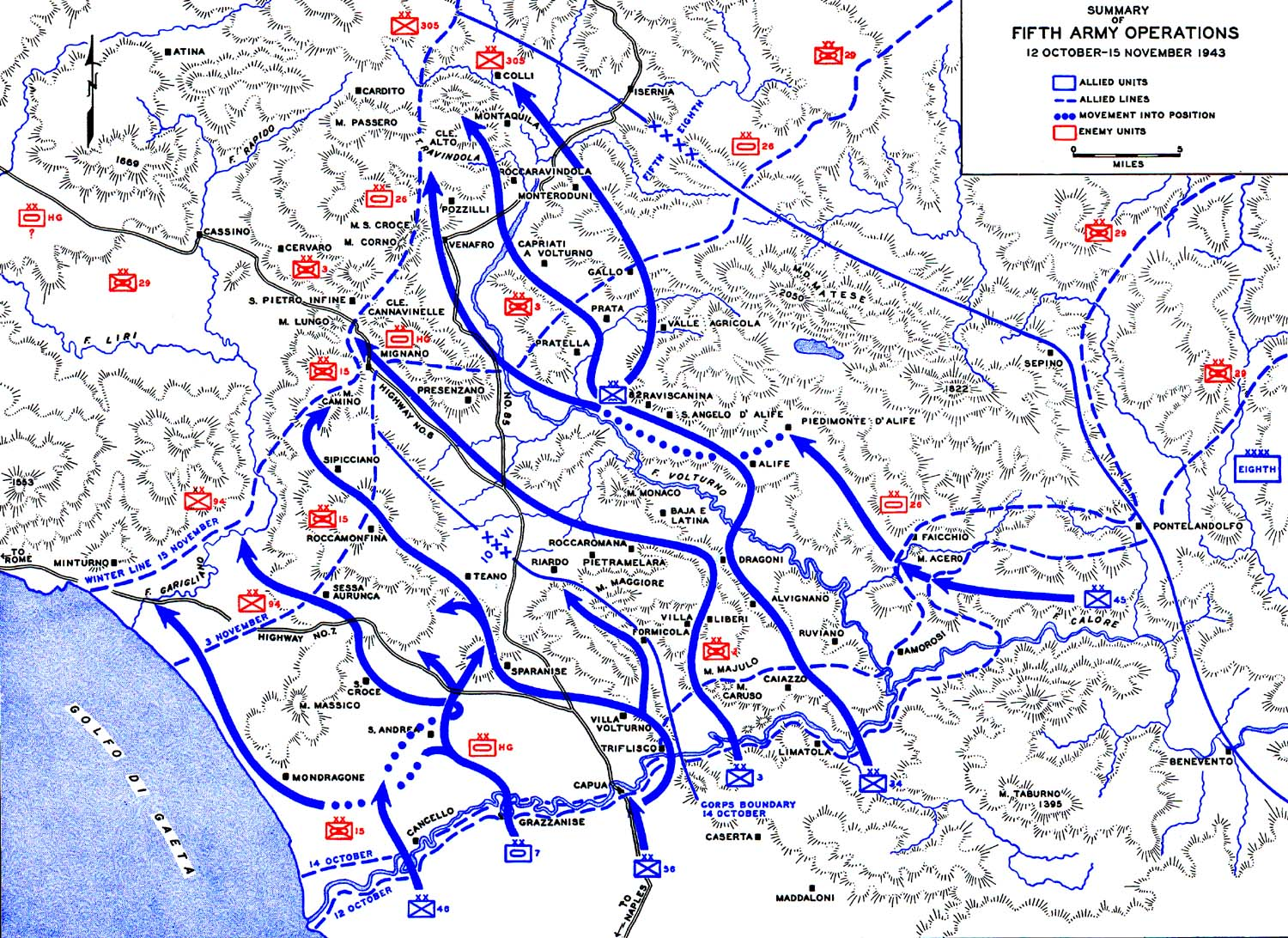
Summary of U.S. Fifth Army Operations, Italy 12 October to 15 November 1943.

On the other coast, the U.S. Fifth Army, commanded by Lieutenant General Mark W. Clark, attacked across the Volturno on the night of 12 October. The Germans, using rearguard tactics, succeeded in slowing the American advance. They skillfully utilized the terrain, which was favourable for defence, to conduct a fighting withdrawal to the next line north (the Barbara Line) which the Allies reached by 2 November.

== Bibliography ==
- Clark, LLoyd (2006). Anzio: The Friction of War. Italy and the Battle for Rome 1944. London: Headline Publishing Group. ISBN 978-0-7553-1420-1.
- Fifth Army Historical Section (1990) [1945]. From the Volturno to the Winter Line 6 October-15 November 1943. American Forces in Action series. Washington: United States Army Center of Military History. ISBN 0-16-001999-0. CMH Pub 100-8.
- Ford, Ken (2003) [1999]. Battleaxe Division. Stroud, Gloucestershire: Alan Sutton. ISBN 0-7509-1893-4.
- Smith, Col. Kenneth V. (c. 1990). Naples-Foggia 9 September 1943-21 January 1944. World War II Campaigns. Washington: United States Army Center of Military History. CMH Pub 72-17. Archived from the original on 6 September 2016.

== See also ==
- Allied invasion of Italy
- Gustav Line
- Barbara Line
- British Eighth Army
- U.S. Fifth Army
