= Mignano Gap =

The Mignano Gap is a geographic feature in Italy, in the vicinity of Mignano Monte Lungo. During World War II, this was the location of the German Bernhardt Line.
