= Winter Line =

Series of German military fortifications in Italy

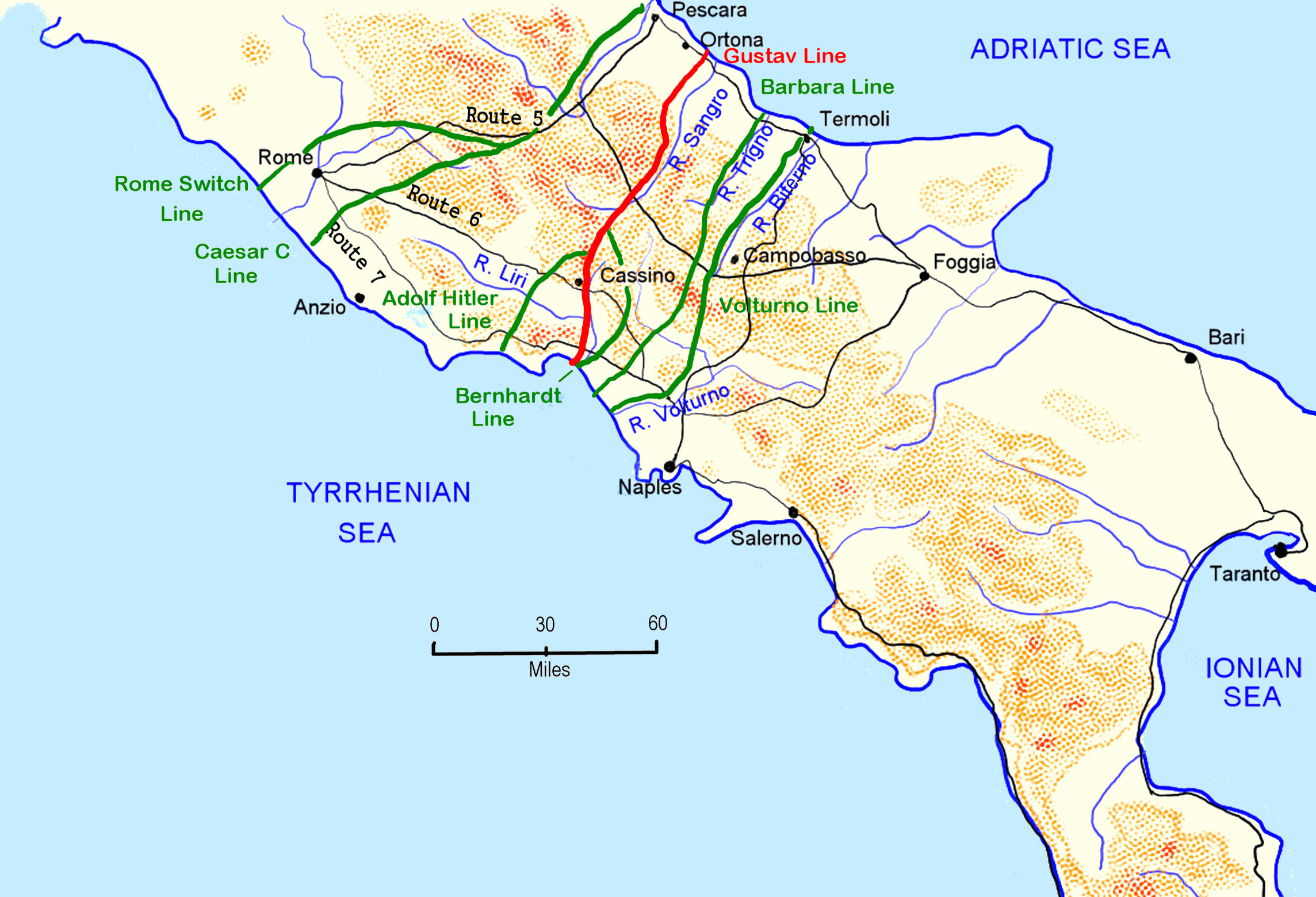
German-prepared defensive lines south of Rome

The Winter Line was a series of German and Italian military fortifications in Italy, constructed during World War II by Organisation Todt and commanded by Albert Kesselring. The series of three lines was designed to defend a western section of Italy, focused around the town of Monte Cassino, through which ran the important Highway 6 which led uninterrupted to Rome. The primary Gustav Line ran across Italy from just north of where the Garigliano River flows into the Tyrrhenian Sea in the west, through the Apennine Mountains to the mouth of the Sangro River on the Adriatic coast in the east. The two subsidiary lines, the Bernhardt Line and the Hitler Line, ran much shorter distances from the Tyrrehnian Sea to just northeast of Cassino where they would merge into the Gustav Line. Relative to the Gustav Line, the Hitler Line stood to the northwest and the Bernhardt Line to the southeast of the primary defenses.

Before being ultimately broken, the Gustav Line effectively slowed the Allied advance for seven months between December 1943 and June 1944. Major battles in the assault on the Winter Line at Monte Cassino and Anzio alone resulted in 98,000 Allied casualties and 60,000 Axis casualties.

== Gustav Line ==
The Gustav Line stretched across the Italian Peninsula and barred the way to Rome for the two Allied armies in Italy: the U.S. Fifth Army in the west and the British Eighth Army (Note: Neither army was homogenous; the US army included British and French troops, the British included troops from Commonwealth nations) in the east. The Allies' grand strategy in the autumn of 1943 was for the Eighth Army to advance through the Sangro River defences, then hook south at Avezzano and enter Rome from the rear while the Fifth Army approached from the south.

The center of the Gustav Line crossed the main route north to Rome at strategically crucial Highway 6. It followed the Liri valley and was anchored around the mountains behind the town of Cassino. Above it stood the ancient Benedictine sanctuary of Monte Cassino, which dominated the valley entrance, and Monte Cassino, which gave the defenders clear observation of potential attackers advancing towards the valley mouth. The U.S. 5th Army was held up in front of these positions through the winter of 1943-44. They attempted to flank the position by the landings at Anzio but bogged down quickly there. A bloody and protracted battle was waged over the monastery, known as the Battle of Monte Cassino.

The eastern end of the line was held by the coastal town of Ortona, captured by Canadian forces in the fierce Battle of Ortona in December 1943 which became known as "the little Stalingrad." Failure by the 8th Army to capture Orsogna however put an end to the Allied plans of a strong drive up the eastern coast. Rain, flooded rivers, and high casualties, as well as the departure of General Montgomery, all put a halt to Allied plans until the spring of 1944. The Gustav Line thus fulfilled the wishes of Field Marshal Kesselring, the commander of German forces in Italy, of keeping the Allies south of the so-called Winter Line.

== Bernhardt and Hitler Lines ==
On the western side of the Apennines were two subsidiary lines, the Bernhardt Line in front of the main Gustav positions, and the Hitler Line some 8 kilometres (5 mi) to the rear. The Winter Line was fortified with gun pits, concrete bunkers, turreted machine-gun emplacements, barbed wire and minefields. It was the strongest of the German defensive lines south of Rome. About 15 German divisions were employed in the defence. It took the Allies from mid-November 1943 to June 1944 to fight through all the various elements of the Winter Line, including the well-known battles at Monte Cassino and Anzio.

The offensive on the Bernhardt Line was launched on December 1, 1943, as part of Operation Raincoat. British and American troops took the terrain around Monte Camino and the Mignano Gap within a week and a half of launching the assault but German operations persisted in the area for months.

Some authorities define the Bernhardt Line as crossing Italy from coast to coast following not just the western defensive positions described above but incorporating also the eastern defences of the Gustav Line. Other authorities use the Winter Line name interchangeably with the Gustav Line.

== See also ==
- Brazilian Expeditionary Force
- European Theatre of World War II
- Italian Campaign (World War II)
- Battle of Ortona
- French Expeditionary Corps in Italy
- Garigliano

== Sources ==
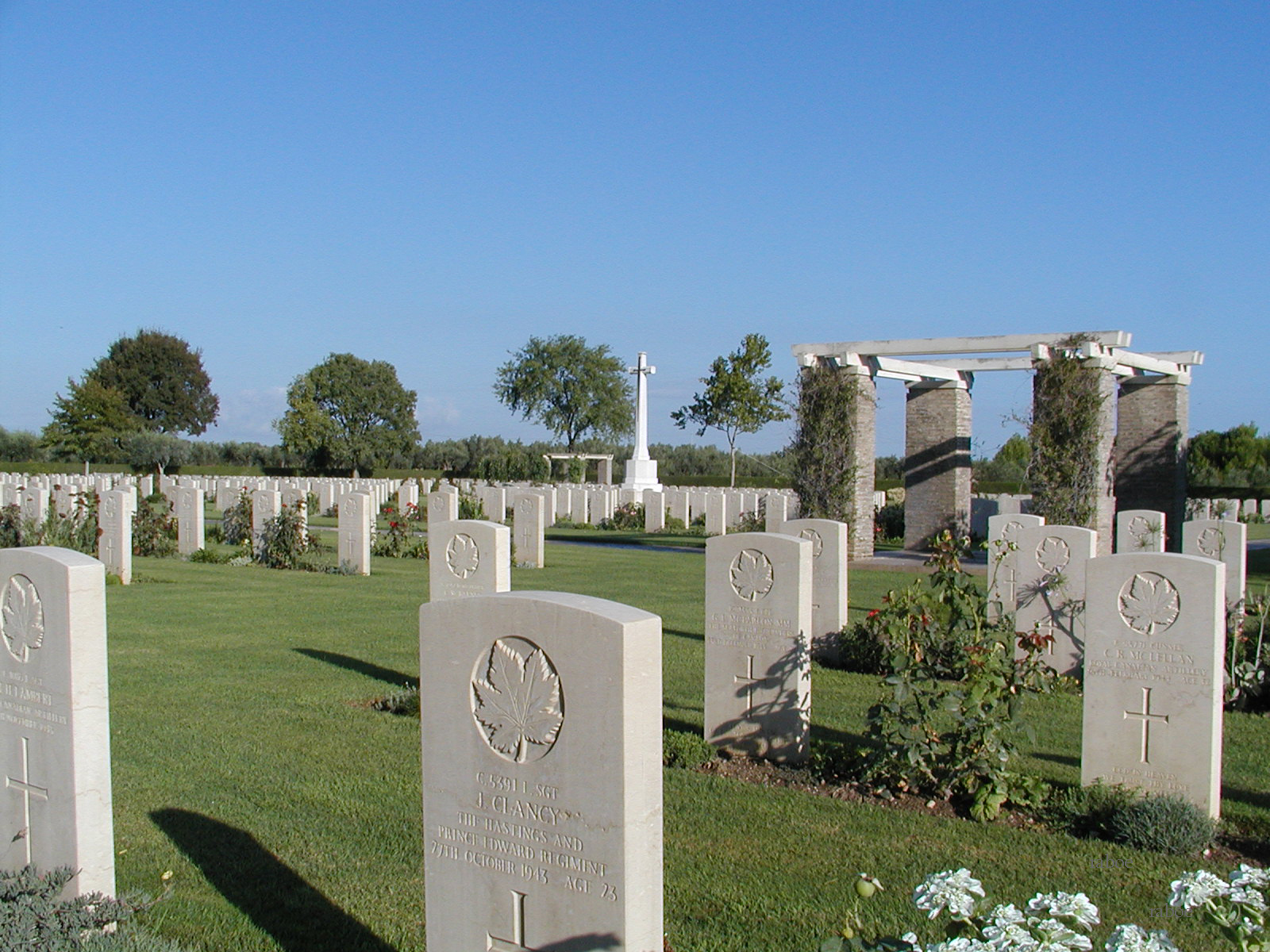
Moro River Canadian War Cemetery near Ortona

- Fifth Army at the Winter Line 15 November 1943 - 15 January 1944. Washington: United States Army Center of Military History. 1945. CMH Pub 100-9. Archived from the original on 21 November 2012.
- From the Volturno to the Winter Line 6 October-15 November 1943. Washington: United States Army Center of Military History. 1944. CMH Pub 100-8. Archived from the original on 31 December 2014.
- Smith, Col. Kenneth V. (1944). WWII Campaigns, Naples-Foggia 9 September 1943-21 January 1944. Washington: United States Army Center of Military History. CMH Pub 72-17. Archived from the original on 6 September 2016.
- Muhm, Gerhard. "German Tactics in the Italian Campaign".
- Muhm, Gerhard (1993). La Tattica tedesca nella Campagna d'Italia, in Linea Gotica avanposto dei Balcani, (Hrsg.) (in Italian). Roma: Amedeo Montemaggi - Edizioni Civitas.
- Field Marshal Lord Carver (2001). The Imperial War Museum Book of the War in Italy 1943–1945. London: Sidgwick & Jackson. ISBN 0-330-48230-0.
- McNab, Chris, ed. (2014). Hitler's Fortresses: German Fortifications and Defences 1939–45. Oxford, UK: Osprey Publishing. pp. 218–269 (Mountain Barriers- German Defensive Lines in Italy). ISBN 978-1-78200-828-6.
- Rainaldi Mario (2019). Le Aquile sul Sangro. Edizioni del Faro, Trento 2019.
