= Trigno =

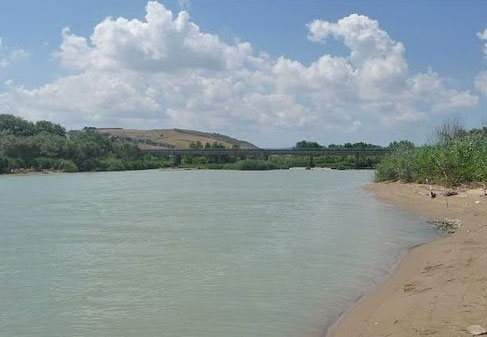

Location
- Country: Italy

Physical characteristics
- Source
  - location: Monte Capraro
  - elevation: 1,150 m (3,770 ft)
- Mouth: Adriatic Sea
  - coordinates: 42.0630°N 14.7968°E
  - elevation: 0 m (0 ft)
- Length: 85 km (53 mi)

The Trigno (Latin: Trinius) is an 85-kilometre (53 mi) Italian river. It originates in the Apennine Mountains, in the province of Isernia and flows into the Adriatic Sea near Vasto. It also forms the border between the regions Abruzzo and Molise.

On 2 April 2026, following bad weather conditions, one of the bridges over the Trigno collapsed. One person who was on the bridge at the time went missing.

== See also ==
- Barbara Line
