= Orsogna =

- Comune
- Comune di Orsogna
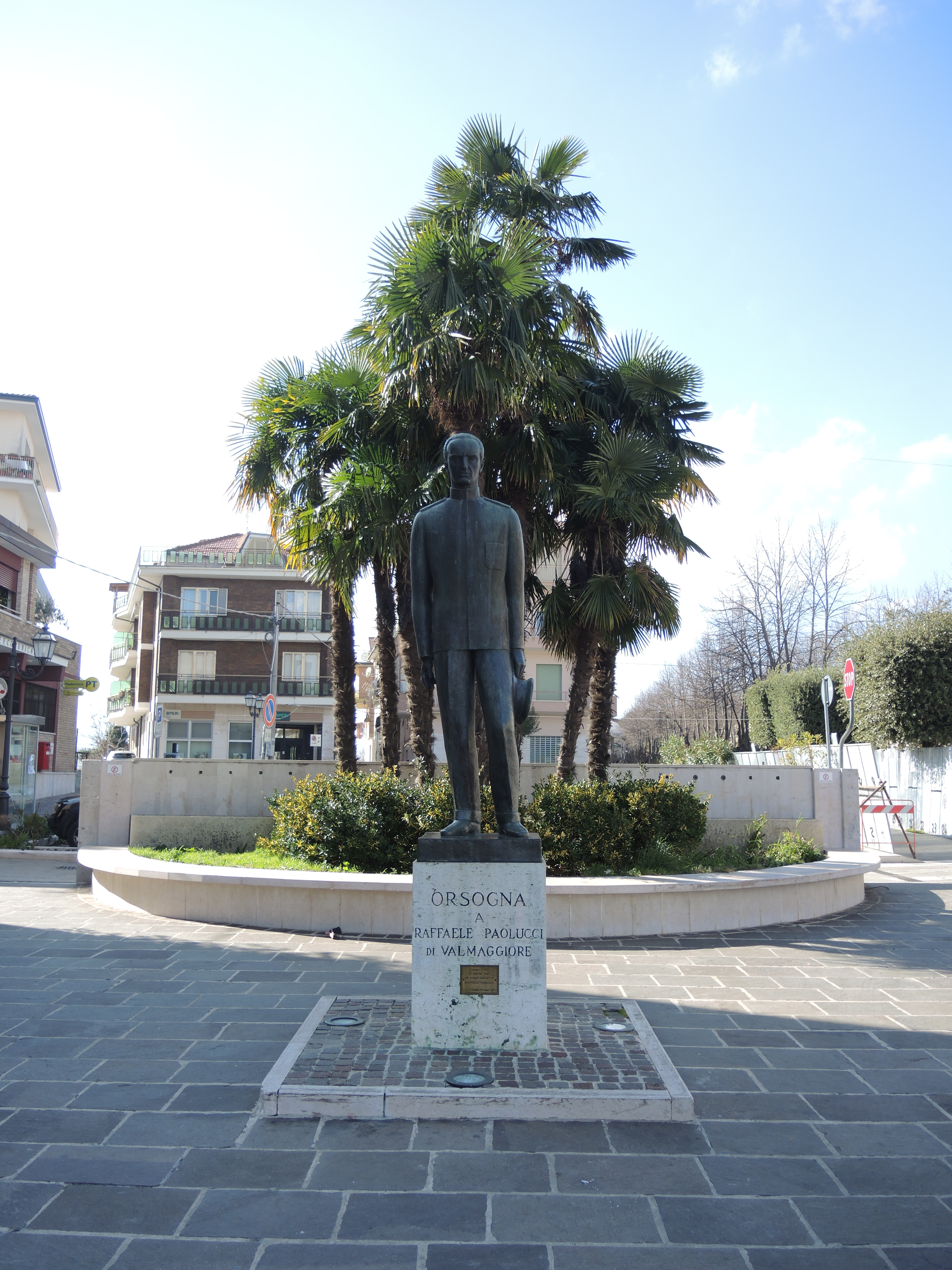

- Coat of arms

- Location within Italy Location within Abruzzo
- Coordinates: 42°13′N 14°17′E
- Country: Italy
- Region: Abruzzo
- Province: Chieti (CH)
- Frazioni: Feuduccio, Ritiro, San Basile, Sterparo, Valli-Coste di Moro

Government
  - Mayor: Andrea Marinucci

Area
  - Total: 25 km^{2} (9.7 sq mi)
- Elevation: 432 m (1,417 ft)

Population (2004)
  - Total: 4,086
  - Density: 160/km^{2} (420/sq mi)
- Demonym: Orsognesi
- Time zone: UTC+1 (CET)
  - Summer (DST): UTC+2 (CEST)
- Postal code: 66036
- Dialing code: 0871
- ISTAT code: 069057
- Saint day: 6 December
- Website: Official website

Orsogna (Abruzzese: Ursógne) is a comune (municipality) and town in the province of Chieti in the Abruzzo region of Italy.
