= List of Albanians in Croatia =

This is a list of Croat Albanians that includes both Croat people of Albanian descent and Albanian immigrants that have resided in Croatia. The list is sorted by the fields or occupations in which the notable individual has maintained the most influence.

For inclusion in this list, each individual must have a Wikipedia article indicating notability and show that they are Albanian and have lived in Croatia.

== History and politics ==
- Giovanni Renesi – Albanian military captain and mercenary
- Giacomo Vuxani – Albanian-Italian politician
- Božidar Kalmeta – Croatian politician and member of the centre-right Croatian Democratic Union (HDZ) party
- Nikola Spanić - Roman Catholic prelate of and nobleman of Korčula
- Valter Flego – Croatian politician, mayor of Buzet and prefect (Župan) of Istria County
- Aleksandar Stipčević - archeologist and historian
- Šime (Simeone) Duka – secretary of Vatican archives
- Ratimir Kalmeta – geographer and linguist
- Đani Maršan (b. 1944) – singer, musician, diplomat and Croatian Consul
- Gjon Gazulli - Albanian Dominican friar, humanist scholar, and diplomat
- Ivo Perović - Regent of Yugoslavia for the underage Peter II from 1934 to 194
- Valter Dešpalj – cellist and professor on Academy of Music in Zagreb
- Ermina Lekaj Prljaskaj – Croatian politician and lawyer serving as a member of the Sabor since 2011
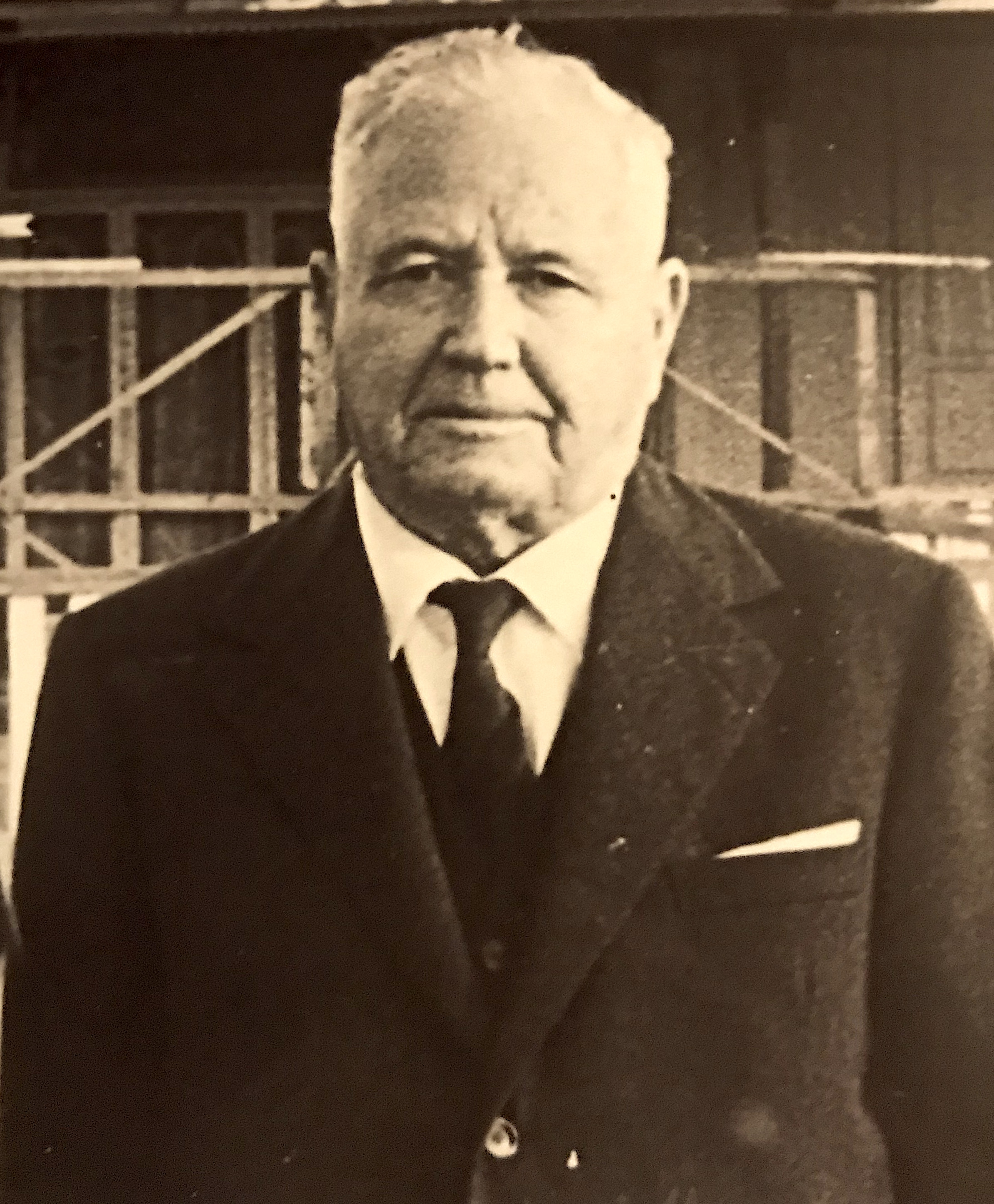
Giacomo Vuxani

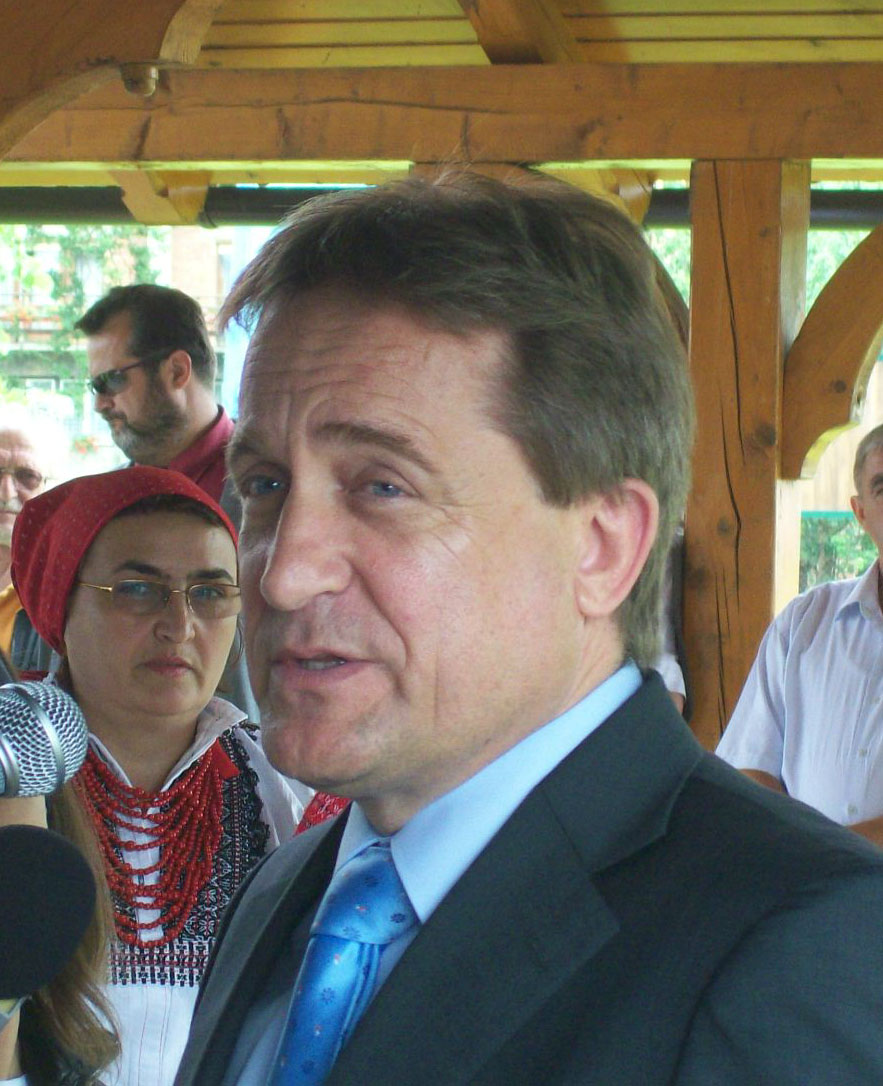
Božidar Kalmeta

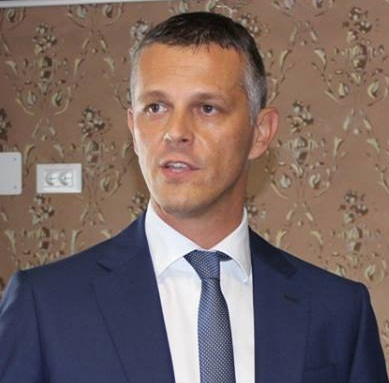
Valter Flego

== Military ==
- Agim Çeku – Commander in the Croatian War of Independence in Croatian Army
- Rahim Ademi – Croatian Army general of Kosovo-Albanian origin
- Ivica Matešić Jeremija – writer, military diplomat and holder of the Order of Danica Hrvatska for culture
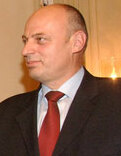
Agim Çeku

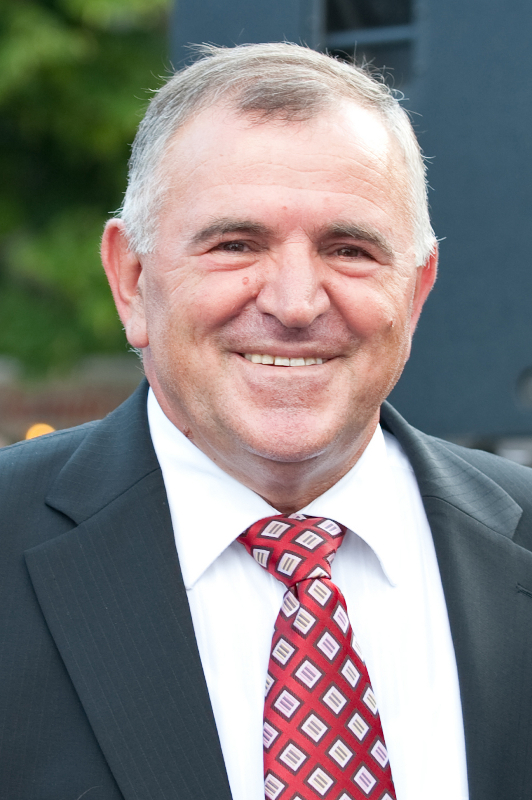
Rahim Ademi

== Musicians ==
- Šime Dešpalj – composer, music teacher, writer
- Pavle Dešpalj – music conductor and composer, member of HAZU
- Marie Kraja – Albanian opera singer
- Vlado Kalember – Croatian singer
- Bepo Matešić – tenor singer
- Valter Dešpalj – cellist and a professor at the Zagreb Academy of Music
- Mladen Grdović – Croatian pop singer
- Ennio Stipčević (b. 1959) - musicologist, member of HAZU
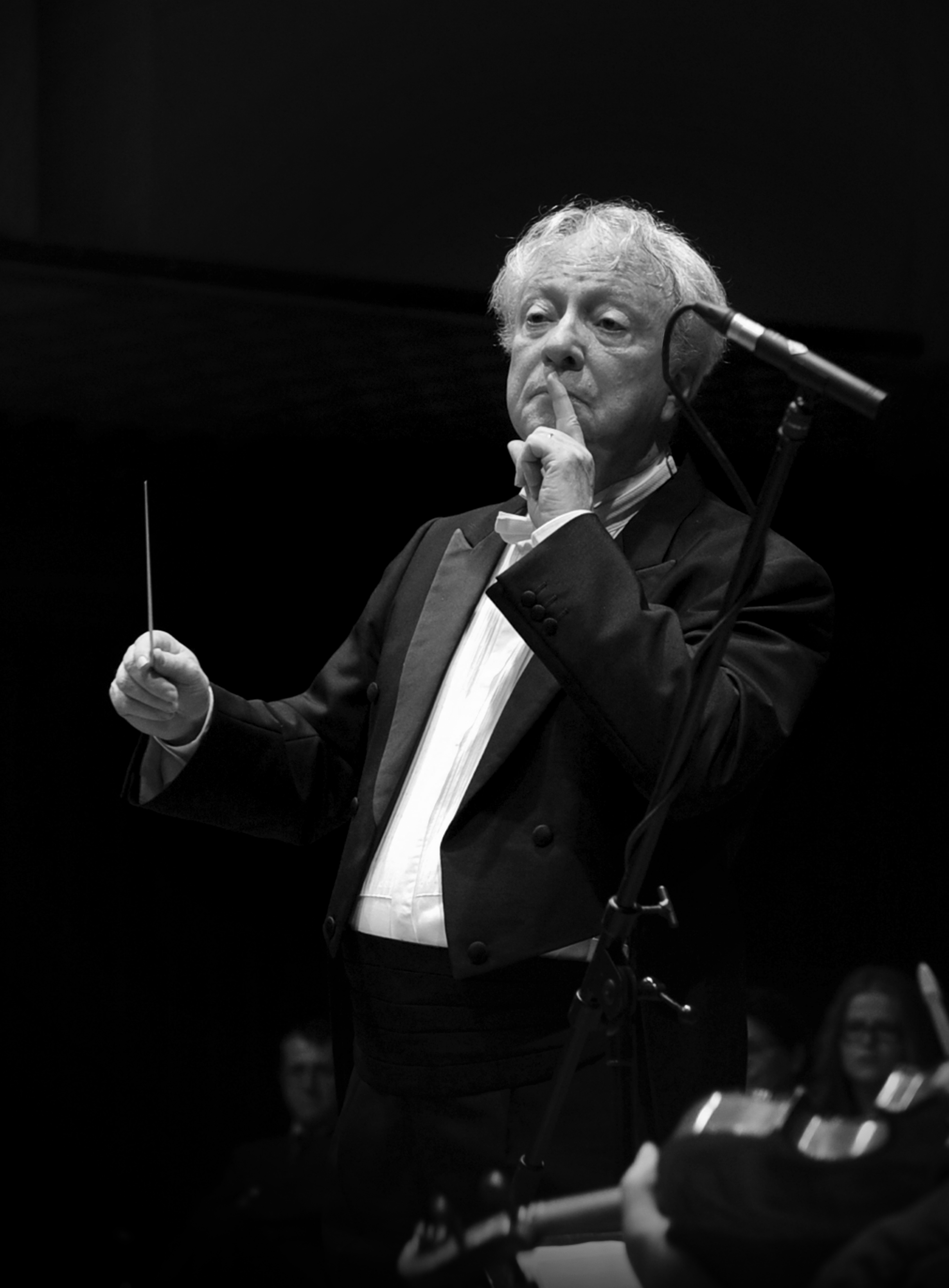
Pavle Dešpalj

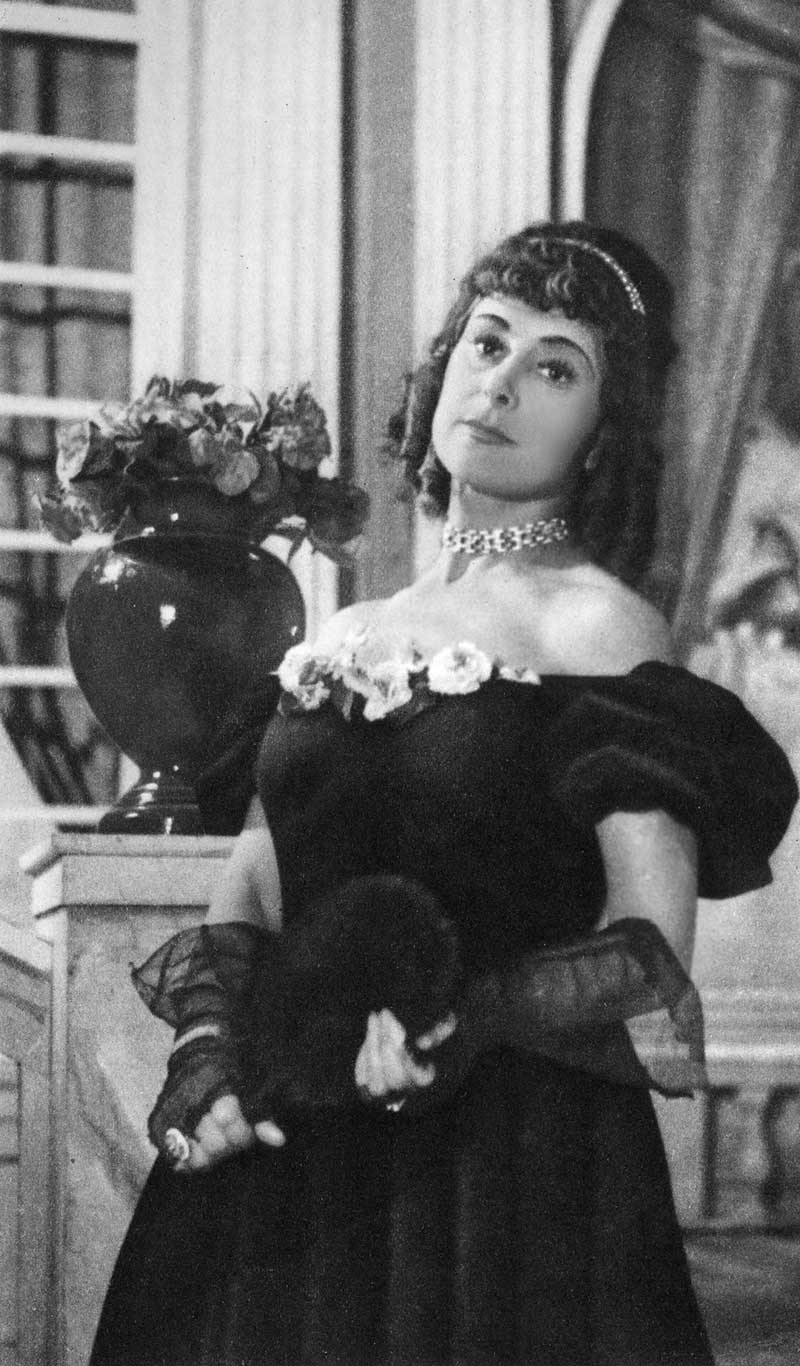
Marie Kraja

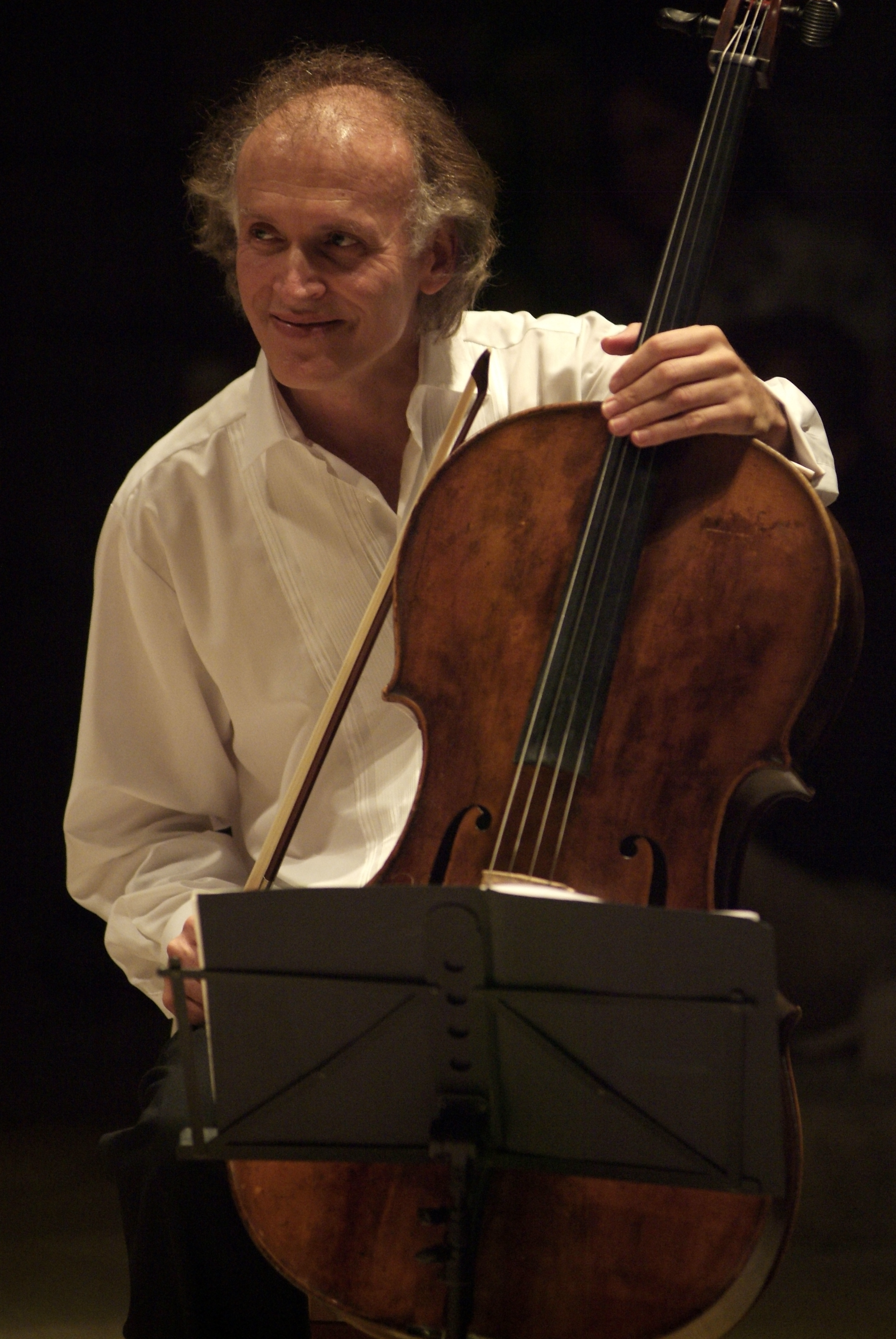
Valter Dešpalj

== Cinema ==
- Anita Berisha – Croatian actress
- Helena Bulaja – Croatian multimedia artist, director and producer
- Nera Stipičević – Croatian actress

== Religion ==
- Ivan Prenđa – Roman Catholic archbishop of the Archdiocese of Zadar
- Janko Šimrak – bishop of the Greek-Catholic Eparchy of Križevci
- Nikola Kekić – bishop of the Greek-Catholic Eparchy of Križevci

== Sports ==
- Josip Gjergja – Former Croatian basketball player
- Vilson Džoni – Former Croatian footballer
- Ardian Kozniku – Former Croatian footballer
- Kujtim Shala – Former Croatian footballer
- Besart Abdurahimi – Croatian-Albanian footballer
- Arijan Ademi – Macedonian professional footballer who plays for GNK Dinamo Zagreb and Macedonian national team
- Toni Domgjoni – Swiss-Croatian footballer who plays for FC Zürich as a midfielder
- Neven Spahija – Croatian professional basketball coach
- Pëllumb Jusufi – Croatian-Macedonian football player
- Edo Flego – Croatian footballer and football manager
- Ivan Bulaja – Croatian sailor and sailing trainer
- Zedi Ramadani – Croatian footballer
- Anas Sharbini – Croatian footballer
- Ahmad Sharbini – Croatian footballer
- Hrvoje Macanović – sport journalist
- Agron Preteni – Croatian kick boxer
- Herdi Prenga – Albanian footballer
- Elvir Maloku – Albanian footballer
- Bogdan Cuvaj – Croatian football manager
- Mario Musa – Croatian professional footballer playing for Dinamo Zagreb
- Tomislav Duka – Croatian footballer
- Enver Idrizi – Karateka and former World Champion
- Rok Stipčević – Croatian professional basketball player
- Agron Rufati – Croatia-born professional footballer
- Elvir Gigolaj – footballer
- Leonard Bisaku – footballer
- Ivan Jakov Džoni – footballer
- Fatjesa Gegollaj – footballer
- Miranda Tatari – Croatian handball player
- Adrijana Lekaj – Kosovan–Croatian professional tennis player
- Jan Palokaj – professional basketball player
- Art Smakaj – footballer
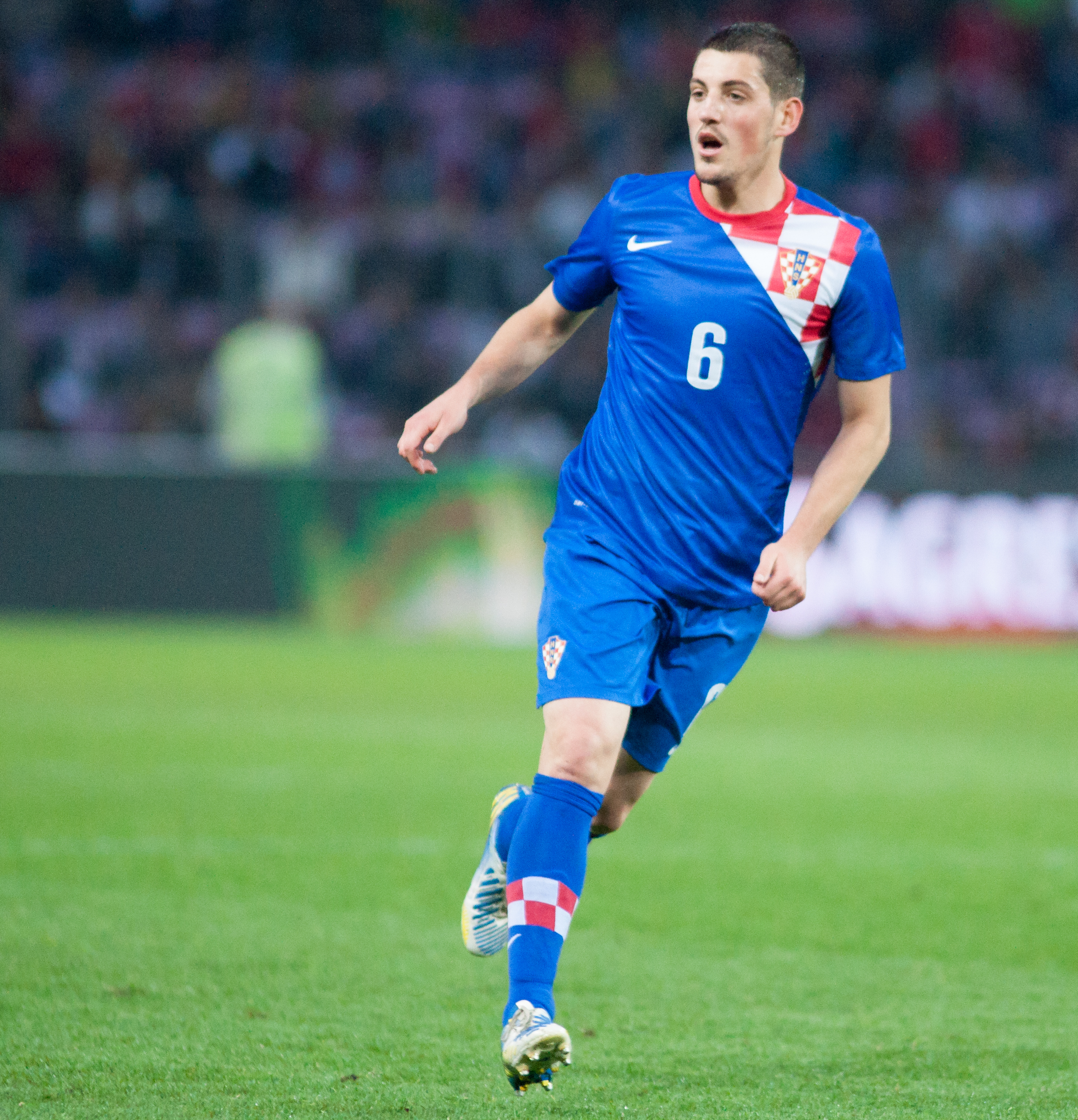
Arijan Ademi

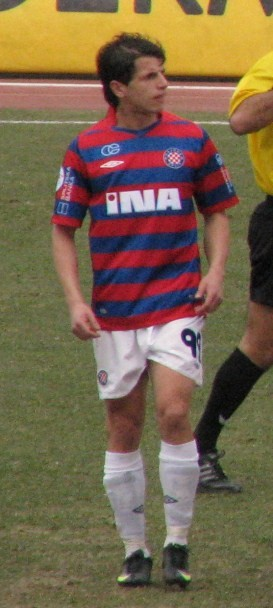
Anas Sharbini

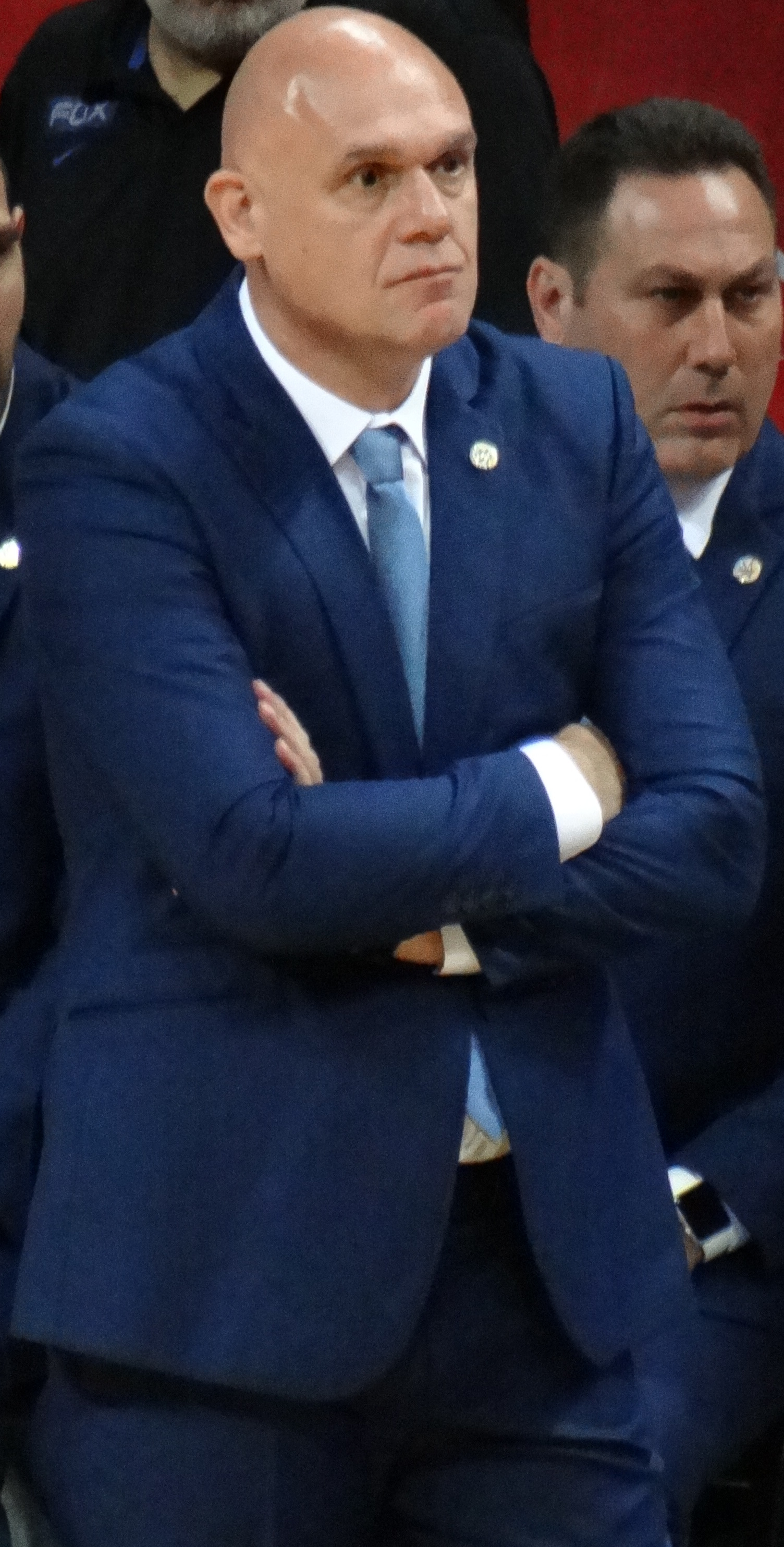
Neven Spahija

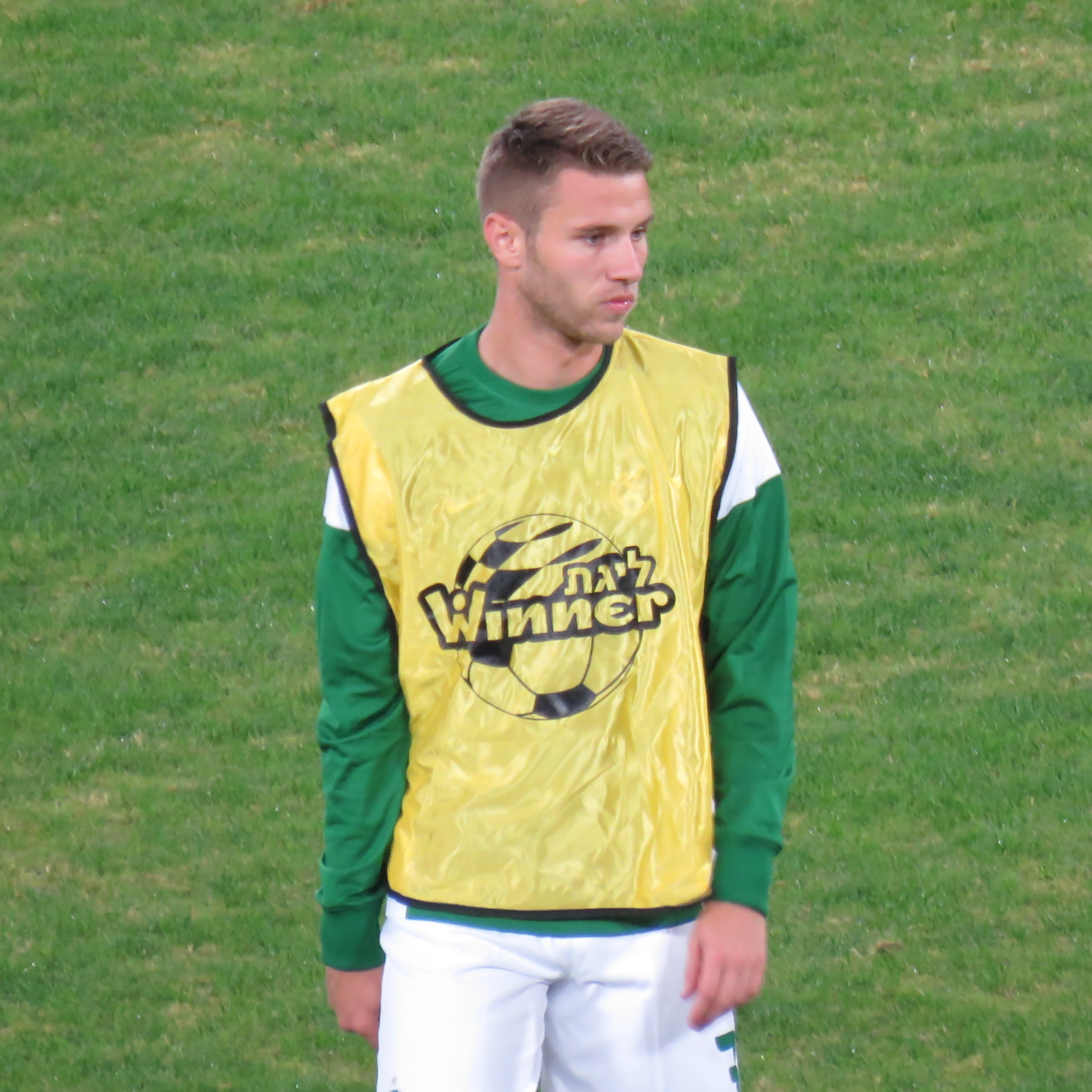
Mario Musa

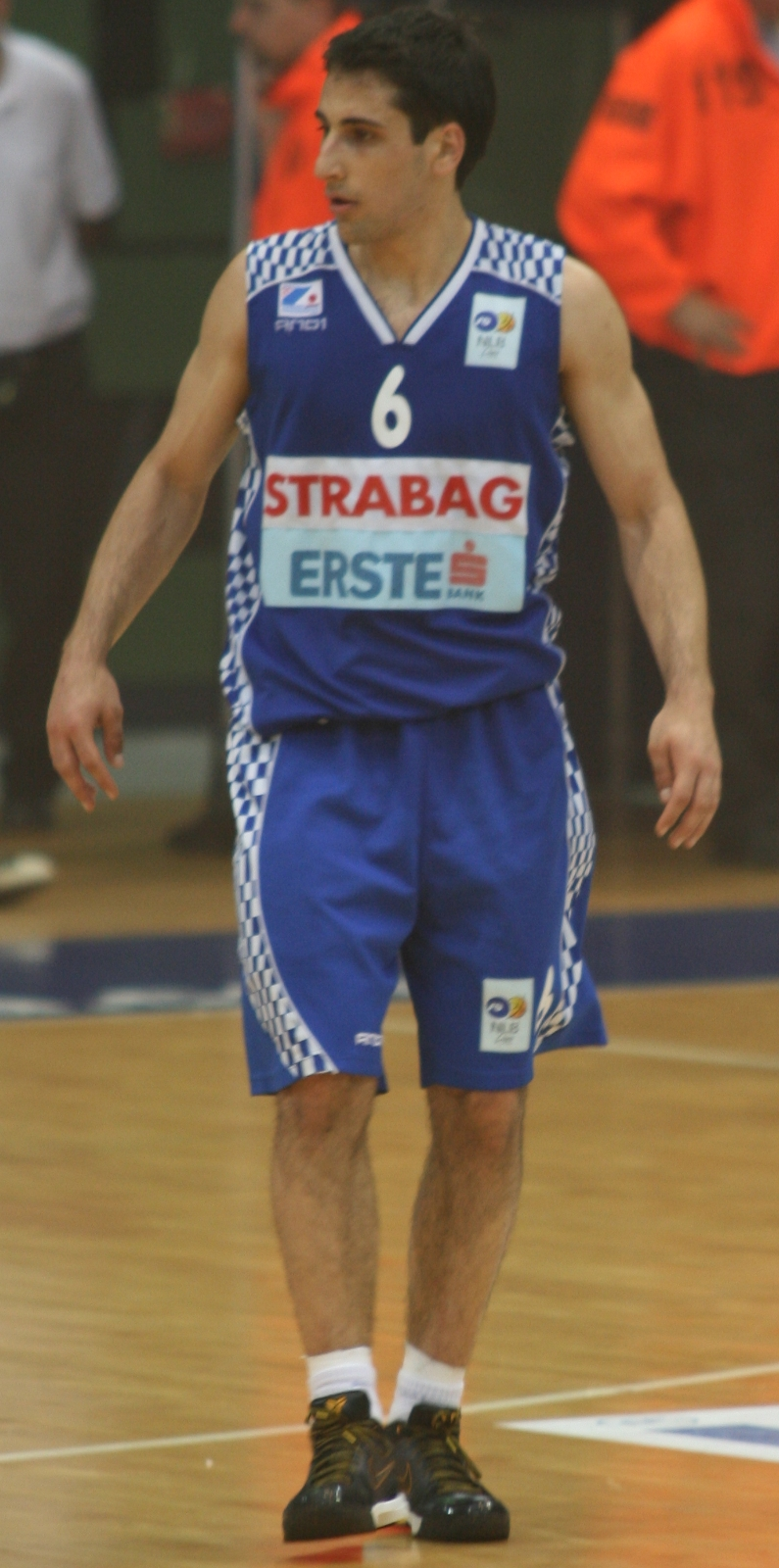
Rok Stipčević

== Writers ==
- Kruno Krstić – lexicographer
- Josip Vladović Relja – writer

== See also ==
- Albanians of Croatia
