= Stipčević =

Stipčević is a Croatian surname. Notable people with the surname include:

- Aleksandar Stipčević (1930–2015), Croatian bibliographer, librarian, and historian
- Rok Stipčević (born 1986), Croatian basketball player
