= Arbëreshë =

Arbën/Arbër, from which derived Arbënesh/Arbëresh originally meant all Albanians, until the 18th century. Today it is used for different groups of Albanian origin, including:

- Arbër (given name), an Albanian masculine given name
- Arbëreshë people, a population group of Italy
  - Arbëresh, the language variety spoken by the Arbëreshë
- Arvanites, a population group of Greece
  - Arvanitika, the language variety spoken by the Arvanites
- Arbanasi people, a population group of Croatia
  - Arbanasi dialect

== See also ==
- Arbanasi (disambiguation)
- Arbërisht (disambiguation)
