= Arbanasi =

Arbanasi may refer to:

- Arbanasi people, an Albanian population group in Croatia
- Arbanasi dialect, spoken by the Arbanasi people
- Arbanasi, an older name for Albanians
- Arbanasi, Zadar, a suburb of Zadar, Croatia
- Arbanasi, Rudo, a village in Rudo Municipality, Republika Srpska, Bosnia and Herzegovina
- Arbanasi (Veliko Tarnovo), a village in Veliko Tarnovo Municipality, Veliko Tarnovo Province, Bulgaria
- Arbănaşi, a village in Beceni Commune, Buzău County, Romania

== See also ==
- Arbanas (disambiguation)
- Arbëreshë (disambiguation)
