= Arbërisht (disambiguation) =

Arbërisht (definite form Arbërishtja) in Tosk Albanian and its unrhotacized variant Arbënisht (definite form Arbënishtja) in Gheg Albanian is the Old Albanian endonym used by the Albanians for their language. It has been gradually replaced by the Albanian endonym shqip since the late medieval times, but still retained by some Albanian varieties to refer to their own speech, in particular by:

- Arbanasi dialect, variety of Northwest Gheg spoken by the Arbanasi people in Croatia
- Arbëresh language, variety of Southern Tosk spoken by the Arbëreshë people in central and southern Italy
- Arvanitika, variety of Southern Tosk spoken by the Arvanites in Greece

== See also ==
- Arbëreshë (disambiguation)
