= Arbër (given name) =

- Gender: Male

Origin
- Origin: Arbëreshë
- Meaning: Albanian
- Region of origin: Albania and Kosovo

Arbër is an Albanian masculine given name and may refer to:

- Arbër Abilaliaj (born 1986), Albanian footballer
- Arbër Aliu (born 1988), Albanian footballer
- Arbër Allkanjari (born 1989), Albanian footballer
- Arbër Basha (born 1998), Albanian footballer
- Arber Bellegu (born 2000), German-Kosovar professional boxer
- Arbër Bytyqi (born 2003), Kosovar footballer
- Arbër Çyrbja (born 1993), Albanian footballer
- Arbër Dhrami (born 1988), Albanian footballer
- Arbër Hoxha (born 1998), Kosovar footballer
- Arber Malaj (born 1989), Albanian footballer
- Arbër Mehmetllari (born 2000), Albanian footballer
- Arbër Mone (born 1988), Albanian footballer
- Arbër Potoku, Kosovan footballer
- Arbër Shala (born 1991), Kosovan footballer
- Arbër Shytani (born 1985), Albanian footballer
- Arber Xhekaj (born 2001), Canadian ice hockey player
- Arbër Zeneli (born 1995), Swedish-Kosovar footballer
