= List of prefects of the Province of Zara =

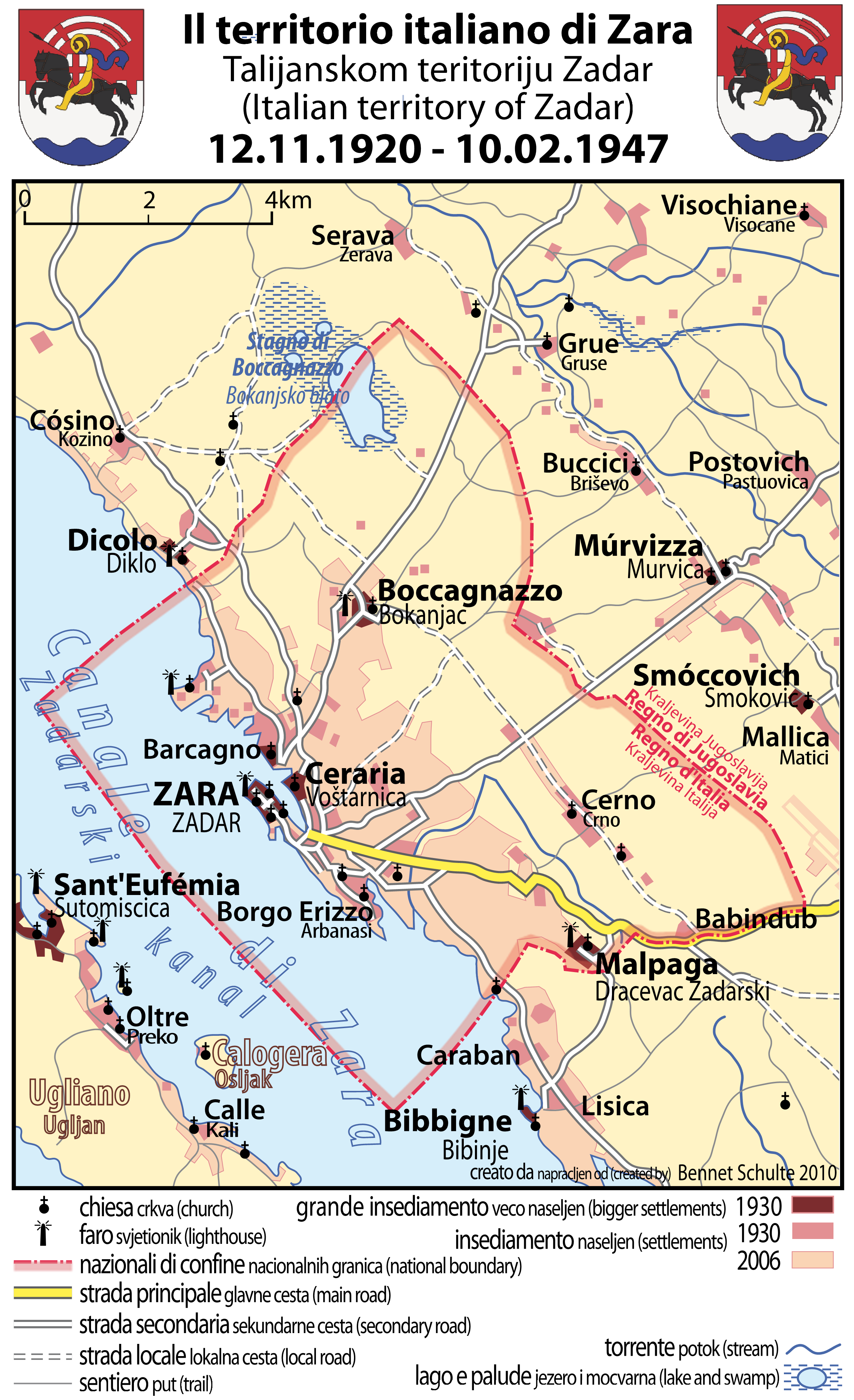
Italian territory of Zara (Zadar) from 1920 to 1947.

This is a list of prefects of the Province of Zara (now modern Zadar and its surrounding area, in Croatia).

== List of prefects ==
Tenure	Portrait	Incumbent	Notes
Italian suzerainty
19 November 1918 to 23 January 1921		Enrico Millo	Military Governor; officially styled Governor of Dalmatia
23 January 1921 to 14 July 1921		Corrado Bonfanti Linares	Civil Commissioner for Dalmatia
16 July 1921 to 1 November 1922		Amadeo Moroni	Civil Commissioner for Dalmatia
1 November 1922 to 16 May 1923		Luigi Maggioni	
16 May 1923 to 1 August 1924		Corrado Tamajo	
1 August 1924 to 11 December 1925		Giulio Basile	
11 December 1925 to 1 February 1929		Pietro Carpani	
1 February 1929 to 1 December 1932		Marcello Vaccari	
1 December 1932 to 30 June 1933		Carlo Solmi	
1 July 1933 to 20 January 1934		Efisio Baccaredda	
20 January 1934 to 21 August 1939		Edoardo Spasiano	
21 August 1939 to 7 June 1941		Giovanni Zattera	
7 June 1941 to 26 October 1941		Manlio Binna	
26 October 1941 to 26 May 1942		Vezio Orazi	
26 May 1942 to 1942		Camillo Bruno	Acting
1 September 1942 to 1 August 1943		Gaspero Barbera	
1943		Alberto, conte Degli Alberti	Acting
German occupation
2 November 1943 to 30 October 1944		Vincenzo Serrentino	Appointed on behalf of the Italian Social Republic
30 October 1944 to 31 October 1944		Giacomo Vuxani	Acting; appointed on behalf of the Italian Social Republic
31 October 1944	Liberated by Yugoslav Partisans		
2 November 1944	Incorporated into the SFR Yugoslavia as part of the SR Croatia; renamed Zadar		

== List of German military commanders, 1943–44 ==
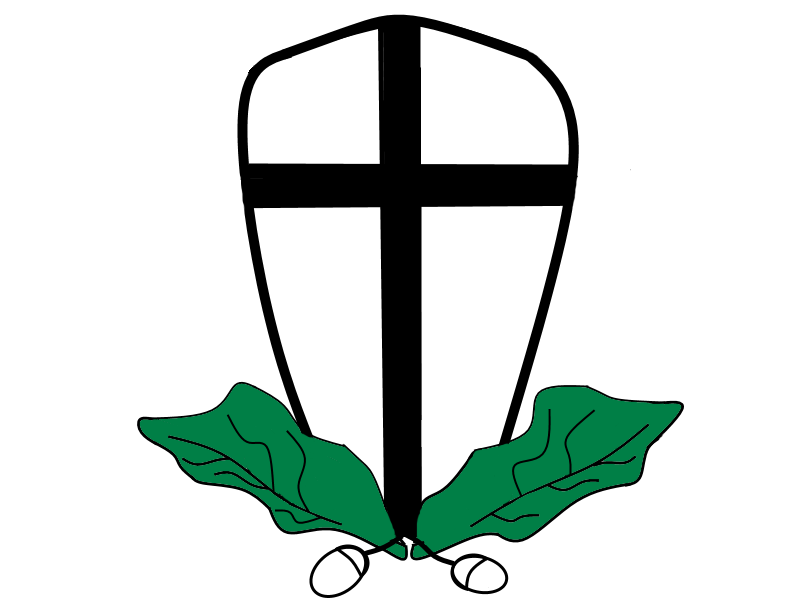
114th Jäger Division insignia

264th Infantry Division insignia

Tenure	Portrait	Incumbent	Notes
10 September 1943 to 1 December 1943		Karl Eglseer	Commander of the 114th Jäger Division
1 December 1943 to 18 April 1944		Albin Nake	Commander of the 264th Infantry Division
18 April 1944 to 15 May 1944		Otto-Joachim Lüdecke	Commander of the 264th Infantry Division
15 May 1944 to 25 September 1944		Martin Gareis	Commander of the 264th Infantry Division
25 September 1944 to 9 October 1944		Paul Hermann	Commander of the 264th Infantry Division
9 October 1944 to 31 October 1944		Alois Windisch	Commander of the 264th Infantry Division
31 October 1944	Liberated by Yugoslav Partisans		

== See also ==
- History of Dalmatia
- Governorate of Dalmatia
- Dalmatian Italians
