= Arbanas =

Arbanas may refer to:

- Arbanasi people, community in the Zadar region of Croatia

== Surname ==
- Constantin Arbănaș (born 1983), Romanian footballer
- Fred Arbanas (1939–2021), American football player
- John Arbanas (born 1970), Australian tennis player

== See also ==
- Arbana (disambiguation)
- Arbanasi (disambiguation)
