= Albania–Croatia relations =

- Albania: Croatia

Diplomatic mission
- Embassy of Albania, Zagreb: Embassy of Croatia, Tirana

The foreign relations between Albania and Croatia are bound together by shared history, neighboring geography and common political ideologies. Both states established diplomatic relations in 1992, following the dissolution of Yugoslavia and the independence of Croatia. They have historically shared a special relationship due to their convergent nation-building efforts. Modern relations are warm and friendly.

Albania was one of the first nations to recognize Croatia as a sovereign state, with bilateral involvement the Croatian War of Independence. They remain close military allies sharing membership in NATO. Albania is an official candidate for accession to the European Union (EU), a move strongly supported by Croatia. Both countries are full members of the Council of Europe and Union for the Mediterranean.

Albanians in Croatia are protected under the Croatian Constitution and are thus entitled their own permanent seat in the Croatian Parliament. According to the 2011 census, 17,513 people of Albanian descent were living in Croatia. Albania has an embassy in Zagreb and an honorary consulate in Dubrovnik while Croatia has an embassy in Tirana.

== History ==
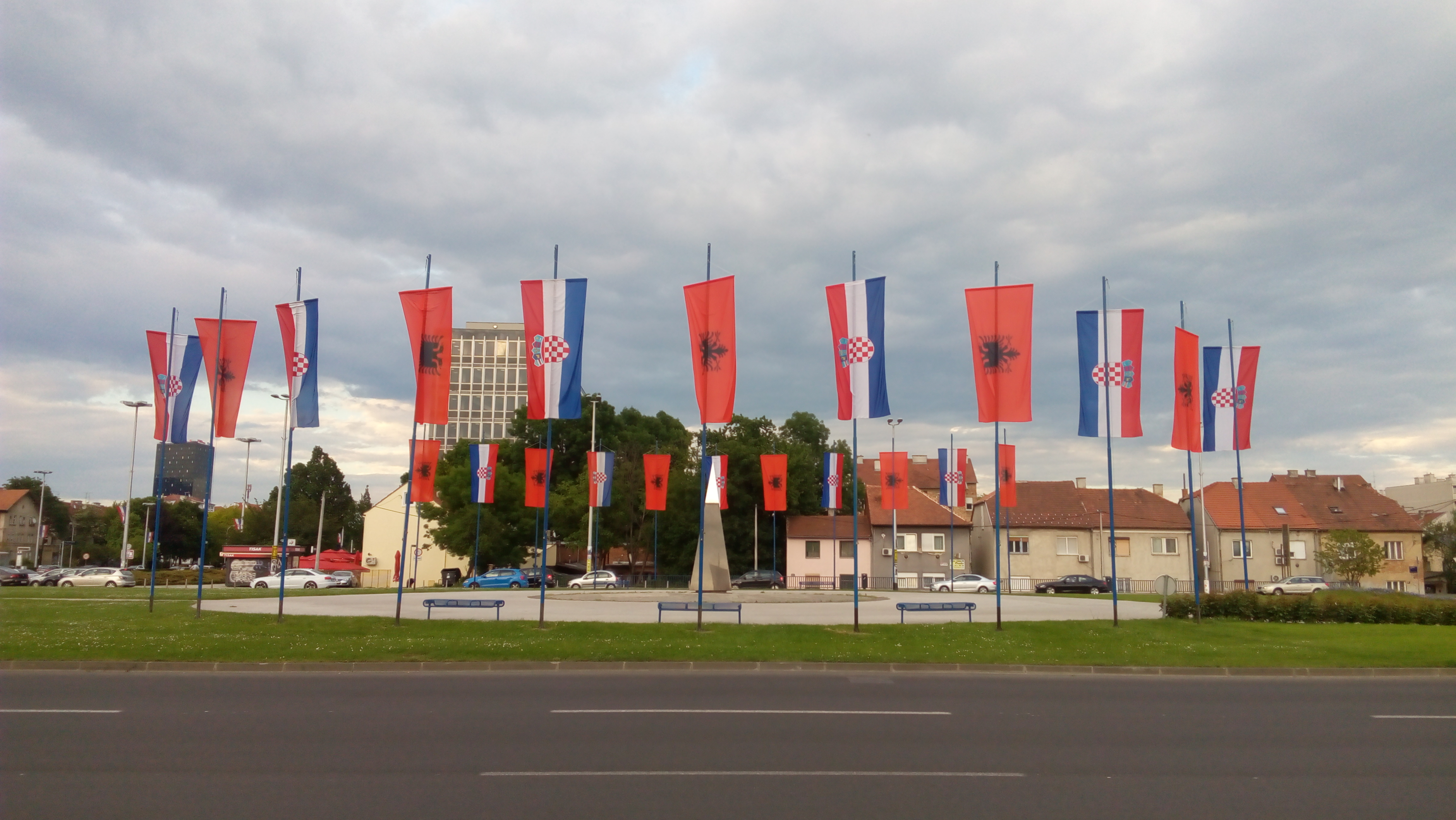
Flags of Albania and Croatia in Zagreb during a state visit by Bujar Nishani on May 9, 2016.

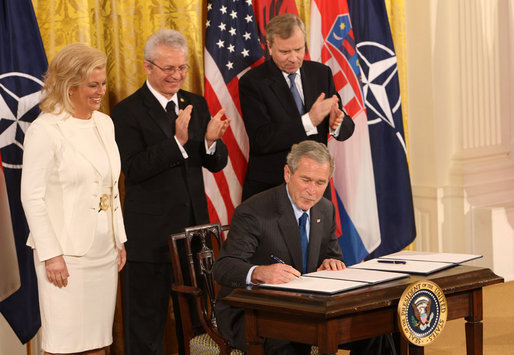
From left to right: Kolinda Grabar-Kitarović, Aleksandër Sallabanda, Jaap De Hoop Scheffer with US President George W. Bush who signs the protocols in support of Albanian and Croatian accession to NATO, 2008.

In April 2009, both countries became full members of NATO at an event which both Albanian Prime Minister Sali Berisha and Croatian Prime Minister Ivo Sanader attended. In the same year, the two countries decided to build a joint nuclear power plant on the Albanian border with Montenegro. This decision was greeted warily by the government of Montenegro, which is worried about the plant's environmental impact. The two nations have a history of defense pacts as part of their military partnership.

The Albanian flag was held and flown in the 20th anniversary of Operation Storm also known as Victory Day of Croatia, to acknowledge the support of Albanians in the Croatian War for Independence. Croatia reaffirmed Albania of its close alliance through this action.

Another major factor in the relationship is historic and current Albanian emigration to Croatia, including the centuries-old Arbanasi community. In July 2016 an Albanian middle-school was inaugurated in Zadar for the Arbanasi people living there and books in Albanian were delivered from the Albanian Embassy in Zagreb. More than 50 pupils started their studies in the Albanian school for the school year 2016–2017.

Three Albanian presidents (Rexhep Meidani, Alfred Moisiu and Bamir Topi) were awarded the highest honor of the Republic of Croatia, Grand Order of King Tomislav.

In March 2025, Albania, Croatia and Kosovo, signed a trilateral defense agreement, following increased geopolitical tension across Southeast Europe. The agreement was signed by Albanian Minister of Defense Pirro Vengu, Kosovan Minister of Defense Ejup Maqedonci and Croatian Deputy Prime Minister and Minister of Defense Ivan Anušić. Serbia opposed the defense agreement.

== Trade and Bilateral Cooperation ==
Albania and Croatia have discussed the possibility of jointly building a nuclear power plant at Lake Shkoder, close to the border with Montenegro, a plan that has gathered criticism from Montenegro due to seismicity in the area.

Both nations collaborate closely on economic matters and initiatives. In 2014, the trading volume was about was 46.330 million euros. An increasing number of Croatian companies are investing in Albania. In 2013, 13.870 million euros of direct investment came from Croatia to Albania. In addition, major Albanian companies are expanding to Croatia.

In 2023, Albania exported $34.3 million to Croatia, primarily consisting of raw iron bars ($6.21 million), various vegetables ($5.35 million), and aluminum bars ($2.84 million). Over the past five years, Albanian exports to Croatia have increased at an annualized rate of 32.7%, rising from $8.31 million in 2018 to $34.3 million in 2023. Conversely, Croatia exported $113 million to Albania in 2023, highlighting Croatia's role as a key supplier of energy and processed food products to Albania, while Albania contributes raw materials and agricultural goods to the Croatian market.

== Visits ==
Guest	Host	Place of visit	Date of visit
(Albania) President Bujar Nishani	Government of Croatia Celebration on the occasion of the entry of Croatia into the EU	Zagreb	July 1, 2013
(Albania) President Bujar Nishani	(Croatia) President Kolinda Grabar-Kitarović	Zagreb	May 9, 2016

== Resident diplomatic missions ==
- Albania has an embassy in Zagreb.
- Croatia has an embassy in Tirana.
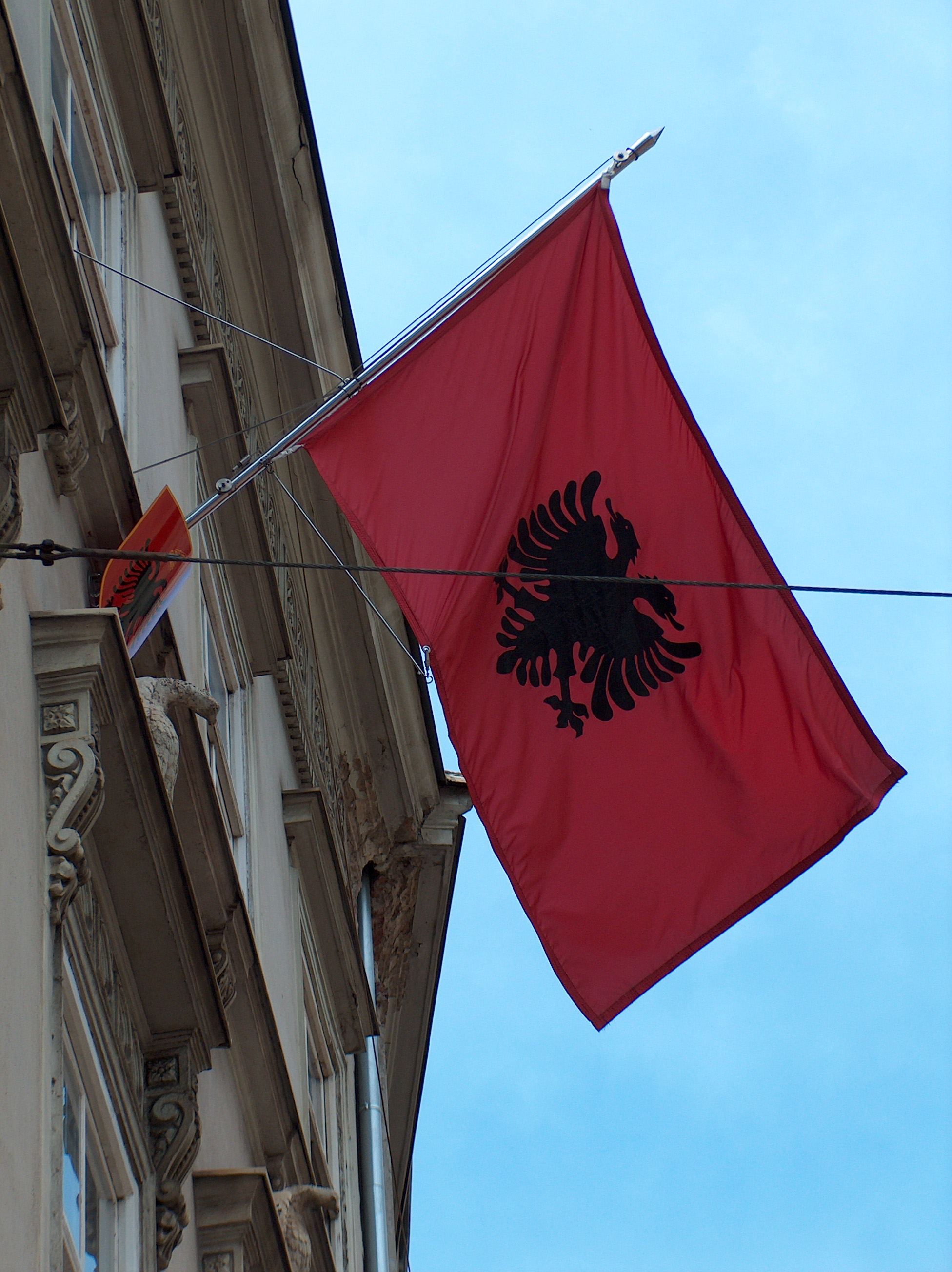
Embassy of Albania in Zagreb

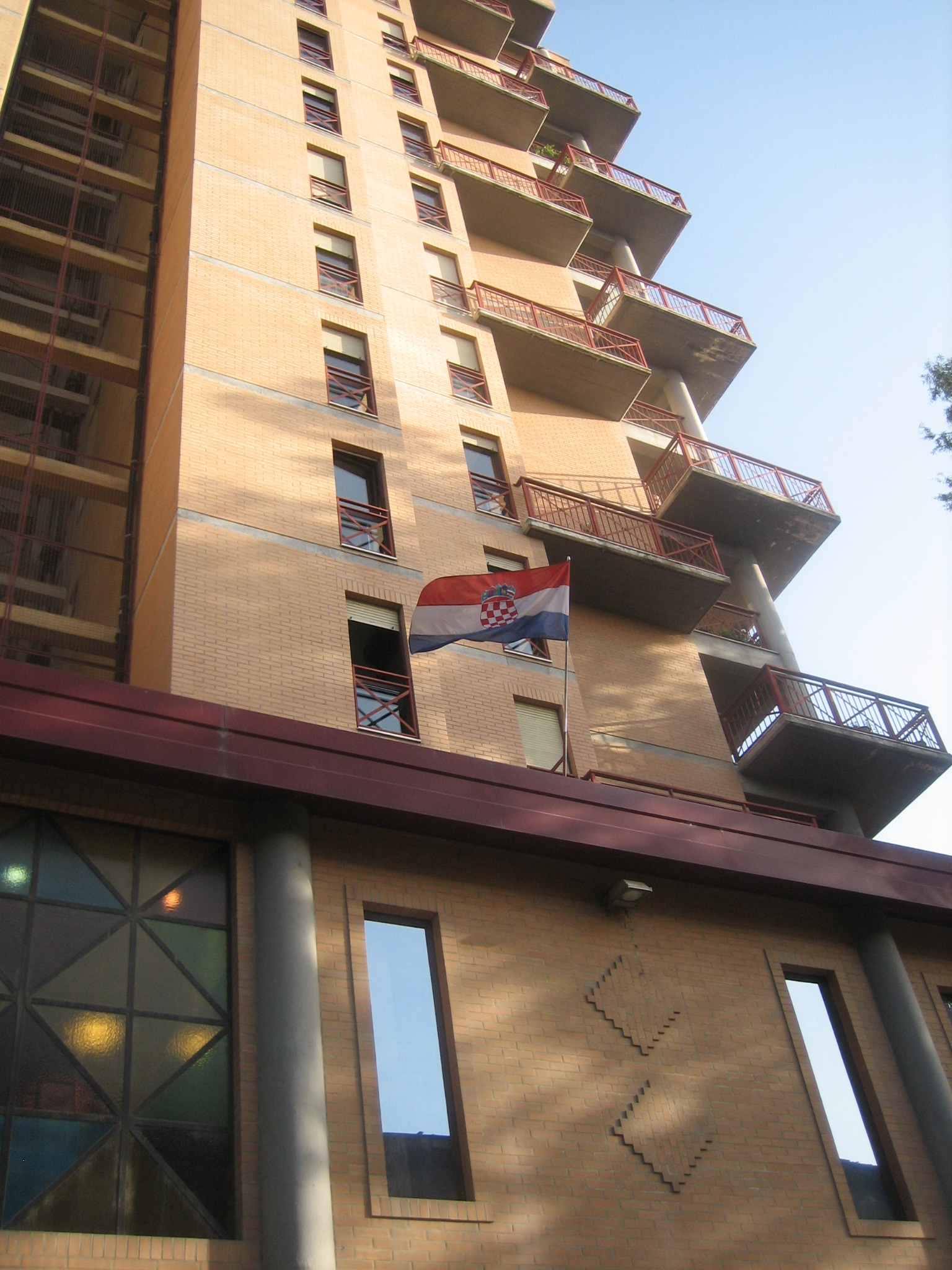
Embassy of Croatia in Tirana

== See also ==
- Foreign relations of Albania
- Foreign relations of Croatia
- Accession of Albania to the EU
- NATO-EU relations
- Croatian War of Independence
- Albania–Yugoslavia relations
- Albanians of Croatia
