= Extraordinary Tribunal for Dalmatia =

Judicial body established in 1941

The Extraordinary Tribunal for Dalmatia (Italian: Tribunale Straordinario della Dalmazia) was a special judicial body operating within the Governorate of Dalmatia (created in May 1941 by uniting the Dalmatian territories annexed by the Kingdom of Italy after the Axis invasion of Yugoslavia to the Province of Zara), with the task of judging political crimes and individuals belonging to Communist organizations.

Established by governor Giuseppe Bastianini on 11 October 1941, it held four trials characterized by a hasty procedure without any guarantee for the accused, imposing forty-eight death sentences, of which thirty-five were executed, as well as thirty-seven prison sentences of different lengths. Formally supported on the following 24 October by the Special Court of Dalmatia, which in fact assumed the same functions in a more defined legislative framework, he celebrated his last trial on 29 October 1941, finally being dissolved de facto by Bastianini in November of the same year.

General Gherardo Magaldi served as its president, with Pietro Caruso and Vincenzo Serrentino as judges and Second Lieutenant Francesco Centonze as public prosecutor. All four were accused of war crimes by Yugoslavia; Caruso was sentenced to death in Rome in 1944 as a German collaborator and for his role in the Fosse Ardeatine massacre, and Serrentino was arrested by the Yugoslavs in Trieste in May 1945 and sentenced to death in 1947. Magaldi and Centonze were never brought to trial for the facts contested by the Yugoslavs.

A decree given by Mussolini on 24 October 1941, replaced the Extraordinary Tribunal with the Special Court for Dalmatia (Italian: Tribunale Speciale della Dalmazia), which took over the tribunal's functionality and had wide jurisdiction. Like the Extraordinary Tribunal, the Special Court worked quickly, informally and arbitrarily. According to statistics of the Yugoslav State Commission of Crimes of the Occupier and Their Assistants, a total of 5,000 people became subject to proceedings in these Italian courts and the courts condemned 500 of them to death. The remainder were given punishments ranging from long prison sentences, being assigned to forced labour or being sent to concentration camps.
