= Arbana =

Arbana may refer to:

- Arbanë, village in the former municipality of Vaqarr in Tirana County, Albania

== People with the name Arbana ==
- Arbana Xharra, Albanian journalist
- Arbana Osmani (born 1983), Albanian television presenter and radio personality
- Reshat Arbana (born 1940), Albanian actor

== See also ==
- Arbanas (disambiguation)
