= Vincenzo Serrentino =

Italian politician (1897–1947)

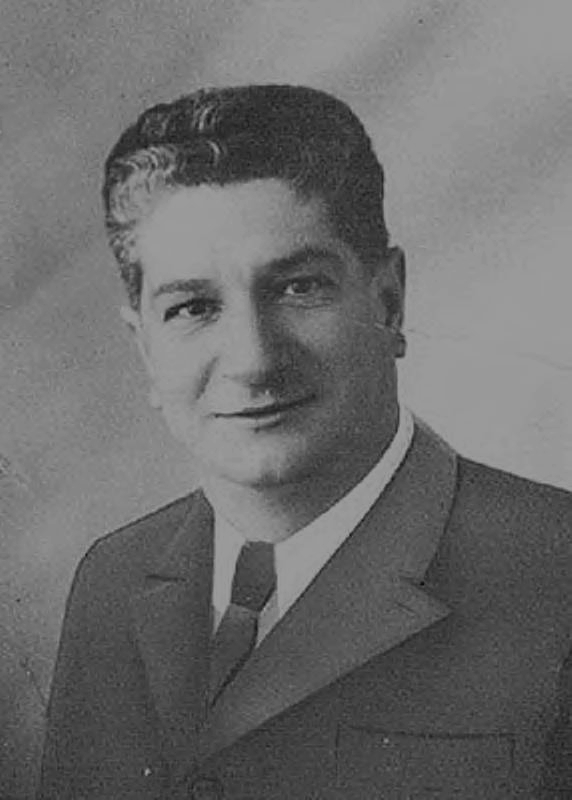

Prefect of the Province of Zara
- In office 2 November 1943 – 30 October 1944
- Preceded by: Alberto degli Alberti
- Succeeded by: Giacomo Vuxani

Personal details
- Born: 19 September 1897 Rosolini, Kingdom of Italy
- Died: 15 May 1947 (aged 49) Šibenik, PR Croatia, FPR Yugoslavia
- Cause of death: Execution by firing squad
- Party: National Fascist Party; Republican Fascist Party

Military service
- Allegiance: Kingdom of Italy
- Branch/service: Royal Italian Army
- Years of service: 1916–1921
- Awards: Croix de Guerre; Order of St. Sava

Vincenzo Serrentino (19 September 1897 – 15 May 1947) was an Italian Fascist politician and civil servant, prefect of the Province of Zara from November 1943 to October 1944.

== Life and career ==
Vincenzo Serrentino was born in Rosolini, in the province of Syracuse, on September 19, 1897. He attended the Military Academy of Modena, graduating as infantry second lieutenant in 1916. He participated in the First World War from 1916 to 1918, initially fighting on the Western Front, where he was awarded the Croix de Guerre, and being later transferred to the Italian front, where he was involved in the training of Serbian troops, for which he would be later awarded the Order of St. Sava by the Kingdom of the Serbs, Croats and Slovenes. On November 19, 1918, he landed in Dalmatia, which had been occupied by Italian troops following the Armistice of Villa Giusti and in view of the annexation to Italy as agreed in the London Pact. Here he worked until April 1919 in Muć, Drniš and Šibenik, later moving to Zara by order of Vice Admiral Enrico Millo, Governor of Dalmatia, where Serrentino held the position of head of the passport office.

Here he remained until he was discharged from the Army in 1921, marrying a girl from Zara with whom he had three children, and then working as a trade unionist in the newly formed Province of Zara. In the early 1920s he was among the main leaders of the Zara section of the Italian Fasces of Combat and joined the Volunteer Militia for National Security (MVSN), reaching the rank of primo seniore (lieutenant colonel) by 1940. In 1939, he assumed command of the anti-aircraft defense of Zara.

After the invasion of Yugoslavia in April 1941, Serrentino became one of the judges of the Extraordinary Tribunal for Dalmatia, established by Giuseppe Bastianini within the Governorate of Dalmatia to fight the Yugoslav partisan movement. In thirteen days, the court presided over four trials held without any guarantee for the defendants. This resulted in 35 death sentences, which were carried out immediately.

After the Armistice of Cassibile in September 1943, Serrentino joined the Italian Social Republic and was appointed Prefect of Zara, a post he held throughout the period of German occupation, from November 1943 until shortly before the arrival of Tito's partisans in October 1944. He was the highest civilian authority in Zara during the period of German occupation; in the same day he formally took office, the town was hit by the first of the dozens of air raids that would leave it largely destroyed and deserted by the autumn of 1944. In a report dated December 20, 1943, Prefect Serrentino reported that 40 percent of the buildings in the municipality of Zara were reduced to rubble, and 90 percent of the rest were no longer habitable. On the following December 31, Serrentino wrote to the Prefect of Trieste, Bruno Coceani, "I only tell you that the city is destroyed (...). I will try to clear the shelters (...) of the few people who still live there, and then I will prevent anyone from accessing the ruins."

On 28 October 1944, three days before Zara was captured by the advancing Yugoslav People's Liberation Army, the Ministry of the Interior ordered Serrentino to leave the town; he did so on the next day, boarding a German torpedo boat that took him to Fiume, from where he later reached Trieste. His deputy Giacomo Vuxani remained behind and was arrested by the Yugoslavs.

Serrentino was in turn arrested on 5 May 1945, when Trieste was captured by Tito's partisans, and was brought to Šibenik, where he was imprisoned. He was later tried for war crimes, namely his involvement in trials by the Extraordinary Tribunal for Dalmatia that had resulted in the execution of forty-three partisans, by a Yugoslav People's Court; he was sentenced to death, and executed by firing squad in Šibenik on May 15, 1947. Against his last wishes about being buried in Zara (he wrote in his last will "I lived for Zara and only in Zara can my body find rest"), he was buried in an unmarked grave in Šibenik.
