= Pietro Caruso =

Italian fascist and mass murderer

Pietro Caruso

Pietro Caruso (10 November 1899 in Maddaloni – 22 September 1944 in Rome) was an Italian Fascist and head of the Rome police in 1944.

Born in Campania in 1899, he fought in the Bersaglieri in the final months of World War I and participated in Gabriele D'Annunzio's occupation of Fiume in 1920–1921. In 1921, he joined the National Fascist Party, and in the following year, he participated in the March on Rome. In 1923, he joined the Volunteer Militia for National Security, rising in rank over the years from capomanipolo (Lieutenant) to primo seniore (Lieutenant Colonel). In 1941, he was one of the judges of the Extraordinary Tribunal for Dalmatia.

After the Armistice of Cassibile, he joined the Italian Social Republic and organised the confiscation of the gold belonging to the Jewish population of Trieste. He met and befriended Tullio Tamburini, chief of the police of the Italian Social Republic, who in January 1944 appointed him questore (police chief) of Verona, and next month of Rome.

Together with Herbert Kappler, the German Gestapo chief in Rome, Caruso organised the massacre in Fosse Ardeatine on 24 March 1944 as revenge for an attack the day before by Italian partisans on a column of German soldiers in Rome. 335 people, many of them belonging to the Italian Resistance, were shot during the massacre. One of the victims, Maurizio Giglio, had been one of Caruso's own lieutenants, but had been arrested seven days earlier as a secret agent working for the Allies through OSS.

Caruso was tried for his numerous atrocities in the Italian Civil War, and sentenced to death on 21 September 1944 under Italian law since the laws of war at the time did not deal with non-international armed conflict (NIAC). He was executed by a firing squad of the Polizia di Stato in the courtyard of the Fort Bravetta in Rome. The high court of justice also condemned Roberto Occhietto, Caruso's secretary and co-defendant, to 30 years' imprisonment on the same collaboration charge. The eight-man high court, presided over by judge Lorenzo Maroni, heard prosecutor Mario Berlinguer characterise the two defendants as “wild beasts” and the verdicts were delivered after two hours' deliberation. Caruso, sentenced to be shot in the back, turned pale as Maroni announced the verdict.
