= Arber Bellegu =

German-Kosovar professional boxer

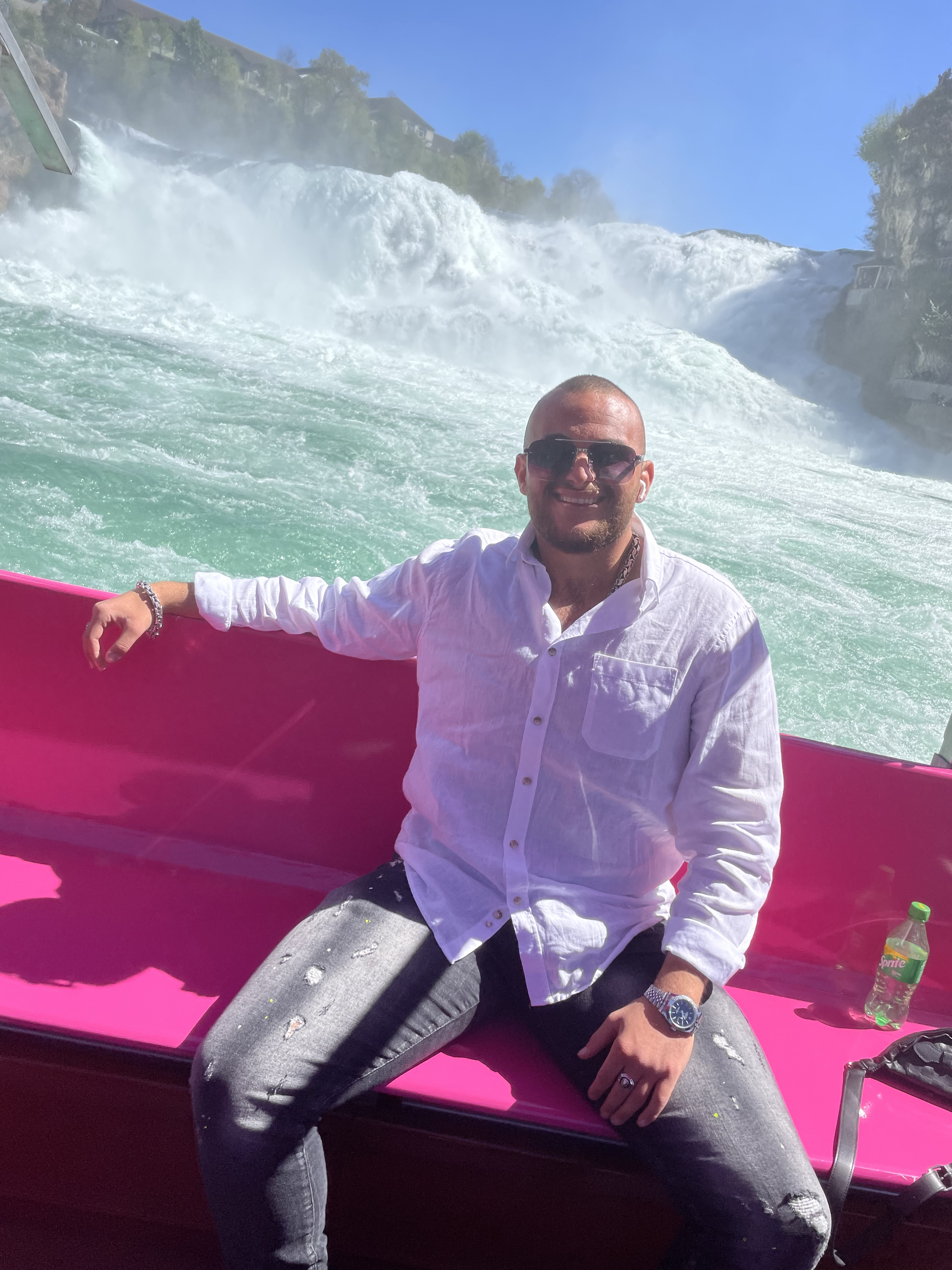

Personal information
- Nickname: Albanian Wonderboy
- Nationality: German
- Born: 11 November 2000 (age 25) Schlüchtern, Hessen, Germany
- Height: 177 cm (5 ft 10 in)
- Weight: Cruiserweight

Boxing career

Boxing record
- Total fights: 13
- Wins: 13
- Win by KO: 13
- Losses: 0

Arber Bellegu (born 11 November 2000) is a German-Kosovar professional boxer and mixed martial arts trainer and manager. Since his debut professional match in 2020, he has won 13 consecutive matches by knockout or technical knockout. As of January 2023, he ranks at #163 at the cruiserweight world rankings.

== Early life ==
Arber Bellegu was born on 11 November 2000 in Schlüchtern, Hessen, Germany. He is of Kosovo descent. He went to school in Wiesbaden, Offenbach am Main and Weilmünster. At the age of 10 Bellegu became obese, and doctors recommended him to start practicing sports. He started to train initially in MMA, and then in boxing as a hobby at the age of 13. His trainers included Enriko Kehl and Sheila Gaff, among others. In 2017 he received an injury, which forced him to stop boxing for a while. At this time, he became a trainer and manager in kickboxing, MMA and boxing, becoming one of the youngest trainers/managers (at the age of 17) in the respective sports.

He and his Family had a Club in Weilmünster.

== Career ==
After working as a trainer and manager for 2 years and establishing his training school, Bellegu was persuaded by his friends, family and his manager Avdyl Salihu to get into professional boxing. He made his professional debut on 12 December 2020, winning against Siddarth Pulapalli during a 30 seconds match which ended with a knockout. Bellegu continued his winning streak for 13 consecutive matches, winning against each fighter by knockout or technical knockout. His tenth match against Robin Hardrick won him the World Boxing Council Youth Silver Cruiser Title.

== Professional boxing record ==
13 fights	13 wins	0 losses
By knockout	13	0

No.	Result	Record	Opponent	Type	Round, time	Date	Location	Notes
13	Win	13-0	Lulzim Muaremi	TKO	3 (8), 0:59	13 Jan 2023	Kreuzeskirche, Essen, Germany	
12	Win	12-0	Robert Weiss	KO	1 (6), 0:48	30 Oct 2022	Fit and Fight, Euskirchen, Germany	
11	Win	11-0	Enzo Melani	TKO	1 (6), 1:10	10 Sep 2022	Elite Boxing Center, Landau, Germany	
10	Win	10-0	Robin Hardrick	TKO	2 (8), 1:02	7 May 2022	Jugendstil-Festhalle, Landau, Germany	Won WBC Youth Silver Cruiser title
9	Win	9-0	Andreas Masold	TKO	3 (8), 1:23	26 Feb 2022	Elite Boxing Center, Landau, Germany	
8	Win	8-0	Aytac Goerueken	TKO	1 (6), 1:23	17 Oct 2021	Elite Boxing Center, Landau, Germany	
7	Win	7-0	Hasan Kurnaz	TKO	1 (8), 2:43	15 Oct 2021	Elite Boxing Center, Landau, Germany	
6	Win	6-0	Lulzim Muaremi	TKO	3 (4), 0:48	1 Oct 2021	Elite Boxing Center, Landau, Germany	
5	Win	5-0	Marcel Sobczak	TKO	1 (4), 0:50	10 Jul 2021	Black Wolves Haus, Wiesbaden, Germany	
4	Win	4-0	Mohammad Wagar	TKO	1 (4), 0:43	6 Mar 2021	Black Wolves Haus, Wiesbaden, Germany	
3	Win	3-0	Reda Amine	TKO	2 (4), 2:58	13 Feb 2021	Black Wolves Haus, Wiesbaden, Germany	
2	Win	2-0	Sandro Laurent Mecani	TKO	1 (4), 1:22	6 Feb 2021	Black Wolves Haus, Wiesbaden, Germany	
1	Win	1-0	Siddarth Pulapalli	KO	1 (4), 0:16	12 Dec 2020	Black Wolves Haus, Wiesbaden, Germany	
