= Rok Stipčević =

Croatian basketball player

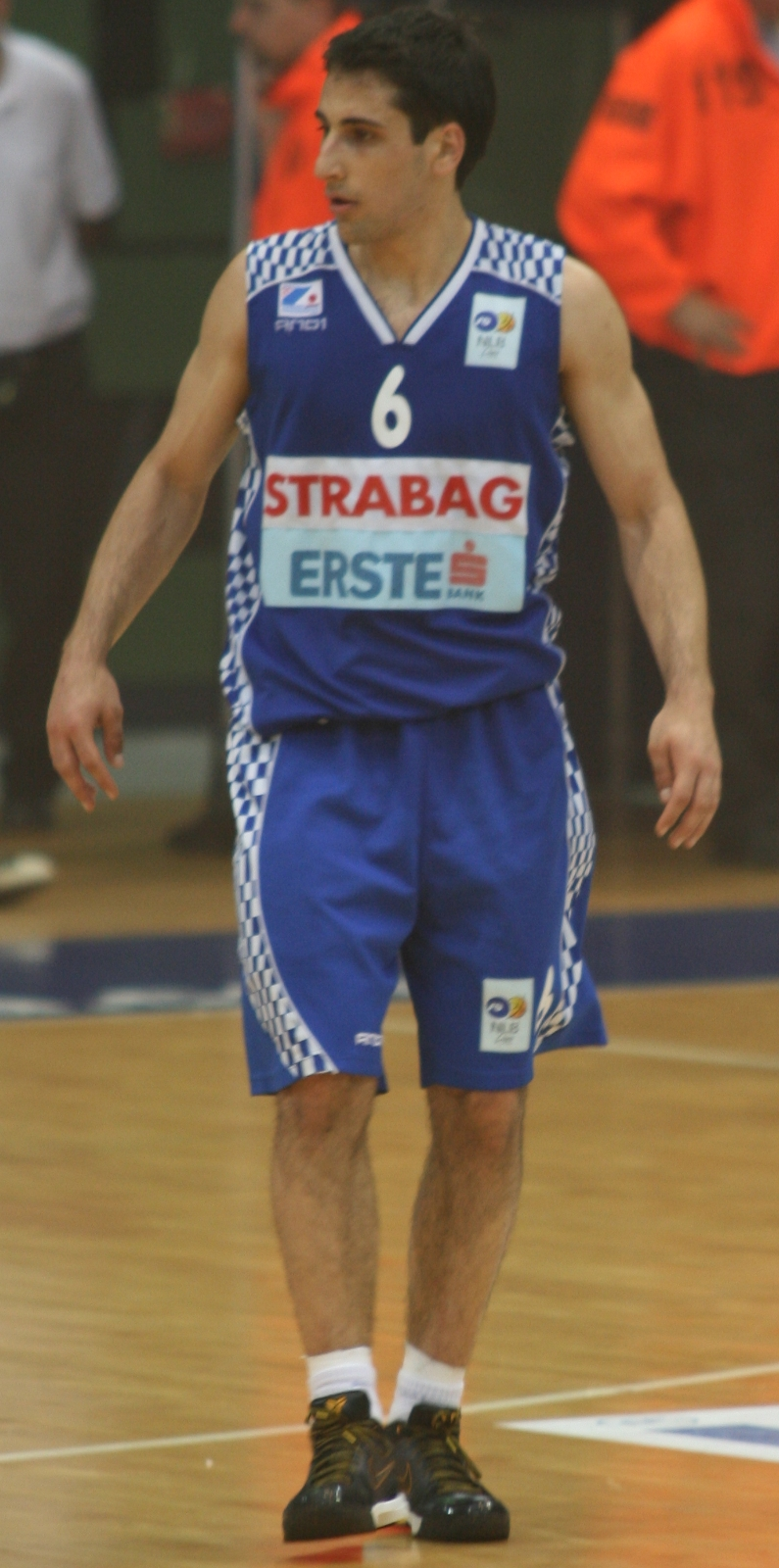
- Stipčević playing for Zadar in 2010

Personal information
- Born: May 20, 1986 (age 40) Maribor, SR Slovenia, SFR Yugoslavia (modern Slovenia)
- Listed height: 1.85 m (6 ft 1 in)
- Listed weight: 85 kg (187 lb)

Career information
- NBA draft: 2008: undrafted
- Playing career: 2003–2023
- Position: Point guard
- Number: 6, 24

Career history
- 2003–2010: Zadar
- 2005–2006: → Borik Puntamika
- 2010–2011: Cibona
- 2011–2012: Varese
- 2012: Olimpia Milano
- 2013: Victoria Libertas Pesaro
- 2013–2014: Tofaş
- 2014–2015: Virtus Roma
- 2015–2018: Dinamo Sassari
- 2018–2019: Rytas Vilnius
- 2019–2020: Fortitudo Bologna
- 2020–2023: Krka

Career highlights
- 2× Croatian League champion (2005, 2008); 2× Croatian Cup winner (2005, 2007); Lithuanian Cup winner (2019); Slovenian Cup winner (2021)
Medals
Men's basketball
Representing Croatia
Mediterranean Games
Gold medal – first place	2009 Italy	Team

Rok Stipčević (born May 20, 1986) is a Croatian former professional basketball player. Standing at 1.86 m (6 ft 1 in), he played at the point guard position.

== Professional career ==
Stipčević grew up in Zadar, Croatia, where he started to play basketball for KK Zadar, joining the senior team in 2003. In the 2005–06 season he was loaned to KK Borik Puntamika. He played for Pallacanestro Varese in 2010–11 season. Stipičević is of Arbanasi (Albanian) origin.

On 11 July 2012, he signed one season with an option for a second one with Emporio Armani Milano. He left them in January 2013, and signed with Scavolini Pesaro until the end of the season. In September 2013, he signed a one-year deal with Tofaş S.K. In September 2014 he signed with the Italian side Virtus Roma.

On 14 July 2015, Stipčević signed a one-year contract with the Italian club Dinamo Sassari.

After spending most of the 2018–19 season playing for Rytas Vilnius in the Lithuanian League, in June 2019 Stipčević signed a two-year deal with Fortitudo Bologna. He averaged 3.5 points and 1.7 assist per game. On 18 August 2020, he signed with Krka.

On 25 May 2023, Stipčević announced his retirement from professional basketball.

== International career ==
He was a member of the Croatian Junior National Teams U16, U18, U20, and is a current member of the senior's National Team of Croatia. With them, he participated in the 2010 World Championship and the 2011 European Championship. He also represented Croatia at the EuroBasket 2015, where they were eliminated in the eighth finals by Czech Republic.
