= Valter Dešpalj =

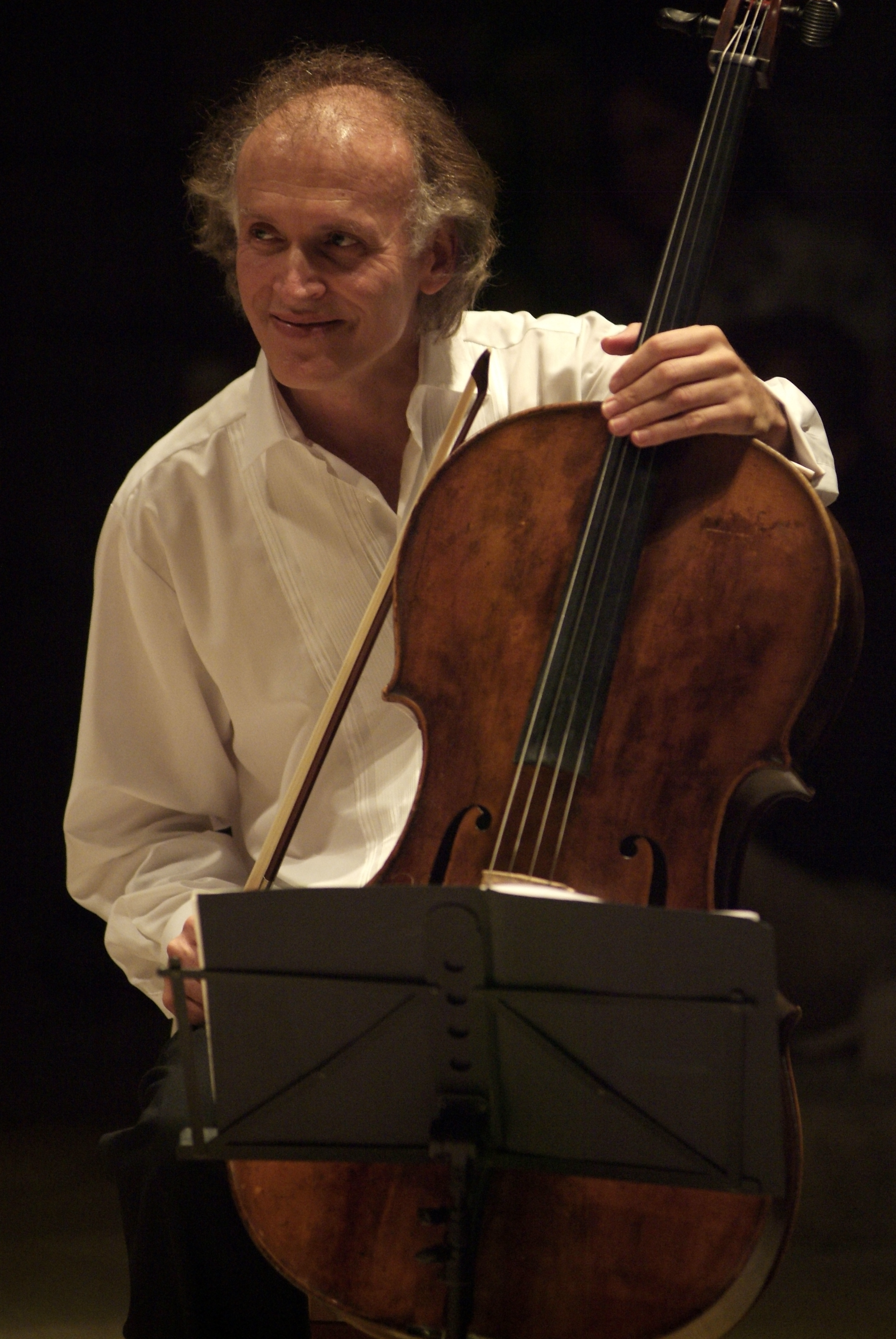

Background information
- Born: 5 November 1947; Zadar, PR Croatia, Yugoslavia
- Died: 9 April 2023 (aged 75)
- Occupations: Cellist, pedagogue
- Instrument: Cello

Valter Dešpalj (5 November 1947 – 9 April 2023) was a Croatian cellist and a professor at the Zagreb Academy of Music.

== Early years ==
Dešpalj was born on 5 November 1947 in Zadar, Croatia to Albanian parents and graduated from the Juilliard School (cello with L. Rose, chamber music with F. Galimir and Juilliard Quartet). He also took master classes with P. Casals, P. Fournier and A. Navarra, and did two years of postgraduate study with G. Kozolupova at the Moscow Conservatory.

== Career ==
Dešpalj has performed all over the world, including performances at festivals in Gstaad, Lockenhaus, Kuhmo and Dubrovnik also in some of the most prestigious concert halls, such as Carnegie Hall, Royal Festival Hall in London, Sydney Opera House, Amsterdam's Concertgebouw, Moscow Conservatory Hall etc. He was soloist with orchestras including Deutsches Symphonie-Orchester Berlin, Dresden Philharmonic, Warsaw Philharmonic, Rotterdam Philharmonic, Dutch Radio Orchestra, Washington National Symphony, Sydney Symphony, Melbourne Symphony and others, under baton of eminent conductors such as Roberto Benzi, Sergiu Comissiona, James Conlon, Vernon Handley, Günther Herbig, Hiroyuki Iwaki, Andrzej Markowski, David Zinman and others. Among his chamber music partners were Gidon Kremer, Yo-Yo Ma, Heinrich Schiff, Philippe Entremont, Yuri Bashmet, Tabea Zimmermann, Irena Grafenauer, Dmitry Sitkovetsky and Alexandre Rabinovitch.

== Teaching ==
A steady stream of international competition winners have come from Despalj's classes. Besides teaching in Zagreb, he has also been a guest professor at the conservatories in The Hague, Amsterdam, Copenhagen and Graz (University of Music), editor of cello music with major music publishers, and member of judging panels at the most prestigious international competitions including Tchaikovsky (Moscow), Bach (Leipzig) and ARD (Munich) competitions.

In 2010, Dešpalj was named by the Croatian Parliament into the distinguished committee that awards the Vladimir Nazor Awards.

Dešpalj died on 9 April 2023, at the age of 75.
