= Arbanasi people =

Arbanasi Arbëneshë
Total population
- ca. 4,000

Regions with significant populations
- Zadar County

Languages
- Arbanasi, Croatian

Religion
- Roman Catholic

Related ethnic groups
- Other Albanians, Croats

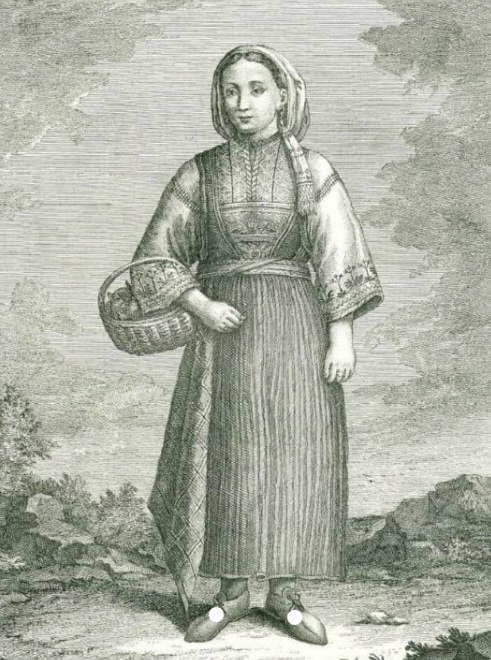
Woman from Arbanasi, Zadar, 1778

Arbanasi (Arbanasi: Arbëneshë) is an ethnic community in and around the city of Zadar in the northern Dalmatia region of Croatia, who are of Albanian ethnic origin. They are traditional speakers of the Arbanasi dialect of Gheg Albanian. Their name is an obsolete way to say Albanians in Croatian and is the toponymy of the first Arbanasi settlement in the region, which today is a suburb of Zadar. In Albanian literature, they are known as "Albanians of Zadar" (Arbëreshët e Zarës).

== Distribution ==
Today, the community is spread across Croatia. Their original settlements were Arbanasi of Zadar and some villages around Zadar, namely Zemunik, Gračac, Dračevac, Crno, Ploča, etc. The former village derived its name from its founders, the Albanians. The Arbanasi are known to have settled the area during two different periods of migration; the first in 1655 and the second in 1726–33.

== History ==
=== 18th century migration and resettlement ===
Arbanasi (Арбанаси) is the old ethnonym that the South Slavs used to denote Albanians, dating back to the Middle Ages. (Note: According to Demiraj: The ethnic name shqiptar has always been discussed together with the ethnic complex: (tosk) arbëresh, arbëror, arbër — (gheg) arbënesh, arbënu(e)r, arbën; i.e. [arbën/r(—)]. p.536. Among the neighbouring peoples and elsewhere the denomination of the Albanians is based upon the root arb/alb, cp. Greek ’Αλβανός, ’Αρβανός "Albanian", ‘Αρβανίτης "Arbëresh of Greece", Serbian Albanac, Arbanas, Bulg., Mac. албанец, Arom. arbinés (Papahagi 1963 135), Turk. arnaut, Ital. albanese, German Albaner etc. This basis is in use among the Arbëreshs of Italy and Greece as well; cp. arvanit, more rarely arbëror by the arbëreshs of Greece — Demiraj (2010); p.534) (Note: An excerpt from Barančić on ethnic and linguistic identity following the migrations: "Možemo reći da svi na neki način pripadamo nekoj vrsti etničke kategorije, a često i više nego jednoj. Kao primjer navodim slučaj zadarskih Arbanasa. Da bismo shvatili Arbanase i problem njihova etnojezičnog (etničkog i jezičnog) identiteta, potrebno je ići u povijest njihova doseljenja koje seže u početak 18. st., tj. točnije: razdoblje od prve seobe 1726., razdoblje druge seobe od 1733., pa sve do 1754. godine koja se smatra završnom godinom njihova doseljenja. Svi su se doselili iz tri sela s područja Skadarskog jezera - Briske, Šestana i Livara. Bježeći od Turaka, kuge i ostalih nevolja, generalni providur Nicola Erizzo II dozvolio im je da se nasele u područje današnjih Arbanasa i Zemunika. Jedan dio stanovništva u Zemuniku se asimilirao s ondašnjim stanovništvom zaboravivši svoj jezik. To su npr. današnji Prenđe, Šestani, Ćurkovići, Paleke itd. Drugi dio stanovništva je nastojao zadržati svoj etnički i jezični identitet tijekom ovih 280 godina. Dana 10. svibnja 2006. godine obilježena je 280. obljetnica njihova dolaska u predgrađe grada Zadra. Nije bilo lako, osobito u samom početku, jer nisu imali svoju crkvu, škole itd., pa je jedini način održavanja njihova identiteta i jezika bio usmenim putem. — Barančić (2008) "Arbanasi i etnojezični identitet". Croatica et Slavica Iadertina, p. 551 Translation: We can say that all in some way belong to a kind of ethnic category, and often more than one. As an example, I cite the case of Zadar Arbanasi. To understand the problem of the Albanians and their ethnolinguistic (ethnic and linguistic) identity, it is necessary to go into the history of their immigration that goes back to the beginning of the 18th century., etc. more precisely: the period from the first migration of 1726, the period of the second migration of 1733, and until 1754, which is considered to be the final year of their immigration. All they moved from three villages from the area of Lake Scutari - Briska, Šestan and Livara. Fleeing from the Ottomans, plague and other troubles, the general provider Nicola Erizzo II allowed them to settle in the area of today's Arbanasa and Zemunik. One part of the population in Zemunik became assimilated with the local population, forgetting their language. These are for example, today's Prenda, Šestani, Ćurkovići, Paleke etc. The second part of the population tried to maintain their ethnic and linguistic identity during these 280 years. On May 10, 2006, marked the 280th anniversary of their arrival in the suburb of Zadar. It was not easy, especially in the beginning, because they did not have their own church, school, etc., and is the only way to maintain their identity and language was verbally." — Translation from Croatian) The ancestors of Arbanasi people are Catholic Albanians who originated from the villages of Briska (Brisk), Šestan (Shestan), Livari (Ljare), and Podi (Pod) located in Skadarska Krajina (Albanian: Krajë) region, then part of the Muslim ruled Ottoman Empire (now modern southern Montenegro). They fled to avoid circumstances of military service and due to religious discrimination or conversion to Islam. Every one of the inhabitants of the village of Pod had left for migration in 1726, leaving the village completely abandoned. Ruins of old houses can still be found in the area today. They originated from the hinterland, demonstrated by the names of fish coming from Croatian. This population migrated into what is today Croatia in two different periods, first in 1655 to Pula, Istria and then 1726–1727 and 1733, to the Zadar area, supported and planned by Archbishop of Zadar Vicko Zmajević and the Venetian republic to repopulate the countryside and hinterland of Zadar.

The first migration to Zadar was mentioned on March 23, 1726, when first arrivals who numbered around 56 individuals, and afterwards another 28 families, were temporarily settled in Kaštel Novi, today Herceg Novi. It is considered that they arrived in Zadar in the summer, in July. The group was guided by two brothers of the Pretani family, and the following people are mentioned:

- Luca d'Andrea Gezghenovich
- Nicolo di Luca Marghicevich
- Nicolo d'Andrea Gasparovich
- Giovanni d'Andrea Gezghenovich
- Pere di Marco
- Prem Vuca Marghicevich
- Paolo Giech Marghicevich
- Giech Prend Marghicevich
- Giech Pepa Marghicevich
- Marco Discialo Marghicevich
- Prenz Prema Marghicevich
- Petar Vuca Gianova
- Nico Matessich
- Luca Prend
- Boso Nico Smira
- Stanica Gielencovich
- Visco Gielencovich
- Lech Pero Marghicevich
- Luca Lucich

The second migration to Zadar was in 1733, and in the document from March 11, 1735, can be seen another 28 families and some members:

- Nicolo Andre
- Crasto Covac
- Marco Giocca
- Giocca Gionon
- Giocca Giuchin
- Stjepo Gjuri
- Stiepo Luco
- Prento Kneunichi
- Lecca Marco
- Prento Marcov
- Paolo Marussich
- Mar Mazia
- Marco Nicadobrez
- Pema Nichin
- Nicolo Pantov
- Marco Pertu
- Frane Popovich
- Paolo Prendi
- Nicola Rose
- Rado Ruco
- Gen Sperc
- Prento Stani
- Vuco Tamartinovich
- Vuksa Tancovich
- Pietro Tioba
- Andrea Toma
- Capitano Nicolo Vlagdan
- Jovan Vucin

They bore surnames:

- Duka (Duca)
- Prema (extinct)
- Mazija (Mazia)
- Gaćeša
- Cotić (extinct branch of Mazija)
- Marušić
- Ratković
- Krstić
- Stipčević
- Mužanović (initially called Kovač)
- Maršan
- Vladović (Vlagdan)
- Ugrin
- Luco
- Relja (branch of Vladović)
- Nikpalj
- Musap (branch of Duka)
- Morović (from Petani)
- Prenđa (Prendi)
- Gjergja (Đerda)
- Tokša, Tamartinović

As well, there were three Montenegrin families: Zanković, Popović, and Škopelja. Other surnames are Dešpalj, Kalmeta, Karuc (Karuz), Kotlar, Jelenković, Jović, Perović, Vukić, and Ćurković.

Around the same time, Chakavian-speaking families from Kukljica, Ugljan, and Zadar hinterland, settled among the Arbanasi, and included:

- Bajl
- Dadić
- Tomas
- Ćućula
- Mateši
- Matija
- Bulić
- Banić
- Smolčić
- Grdović
- Zubčić
- Ljubičić
- Labus

These eventually integrated into the Arbanasi community to the extent that they are now considered real Arbanasi. Their church, Saint Mary of Loreto, was built from 1734, and founded in 1737.

All these groups were integrated into the social and economic sphere of Venetian Dalmatia, but they preserved their language, customs and songs. The Arbanasi settled on the outskirts of Zadar on lands provided by Venetian landowner Erizzo. First, the Albanian community worked to claim the marshy areas near their settlement (Arbanasi), which was originally an island now connected to the mainland, and then got the leasing right of cultivation of the land. The Venetian government took charge of construction of many homes and, at first, even meals. Other Arbanasi settled in the neighbouring villages of Ćurkovići, Paleke, Prenđe and Šestani, as well in the towns of Kotor, Dubrovnik and Zemunik. All other Arbanasi were assimilated, except in Zadar where a settlement formed that they called Arbënesh (for the Italians Borgo Erizzo, for the Croats Varoš Eričina), later becoming known in all local languages as Arbanasi.

=== 19th and 20th century ===
The survival of the language was due to factors involving generational transmission of Arbanasi Albanian through oral traditions of reciting folktales in social gatherings, awareness of linguistic differences from Croatian speakers and teaching the language to non-Arbanasi spouses in cases of marriage. In the nineteenth and early twentieth century, Dalmatia was under Habsburg rule. The establishment of a primary school in 1896 resulted in some Arbanasi receiving a mainly Italian-language education with some Croatian and two weekly lessons in Arbanasi Albanian. Another primary school existed teaching mostly in Croatian and in 1901, it made learning Arbanasi Albanian obligatory for students who had it as a mother tongue. In 1910, Giacomo Vuxani and Arbanasi promoted and organised the Italo-Albanian Association in Zadar.

During the early to mid twentieth century, Arbanasi were divided along national lines and people in the community self identified either as Italians or Croats. After World War One, Zadar became part of Italy and during the interwar period, Arbanasi Albanian was at first tolerated and in later years banned from being spoken and taught in school. Following the Second World War, many Arbanasi people from village of Arbanasi who self identified as ethnically Italian emigrated to Italy, or made by communist authorities to forcefully leave following the Yugoslav takeover of Zadar. In Yugoslavia, Arbanasi Albanian was not taught by the school system. Contact between Arbanasi and Albanians was nonexistent from the eighteenth century until the late nineteenth century. From the mid twentieth century onward, as the region was part of Yugoslavia, Albanians from other parts of the country settled in the area of the Arbanasi.

With the Italian administration of Zadar in the interwar period, the Albanian language was initially tolerated and then banned from teaching and public use. After World War II, many Arbanasi fled Dalmatia or were forced into exile by the new communist authorities. Vuxani himself, already a volunteer at the Rijeka company, was the last Italian authority in Zadar at the time of the entry of the Yugoslav partisans. Arrested and sentenced to death, he was later released and organized the repatriation of 950 Italians from Zara until June 1947. Other Arbëresh remained: among them Krsto Tomas (1908-1988) who was responsible for the restoration of the monuments in Zadar damaged by Allied bombing. But the most famous post-war Arbanasi personality was the historian and archaeologist Aleksandar Stipčević (1930-2015) whose family had arrived 300 years ago from the Shkodër region and who became a member of the Kosovo Academy of Sciences and Arts. His masterpiece was the 1974 book "Gli Illyri", translated into English, Italian and Albanian.

=== 21st century ===
In the twenty first century, Arbanasi self identify as Croats or Arbanas Croats and do not want their community associated with the officially recognised Albanian minority of Croatia. Arbanasi Albanian, once spoken by much of the community and served as a significant identity marker has nearly disappeared, due to the historical and political stigmatisation of Albanian in the former Yugoslavia and the recent period of globalisation. In independent Croatia, for some years the language did not receive encouragement until the 2010s. In modern times about 4000 Arbanasi remain in Croatia. Arbanasi Albanian is currently endangered and fewer than 200 speakers competent in the language exist. An additional 500 people can understand it to a certain degree. Apart from a few publications like the journal Feja and collections of Arbanasi lore, the language is not written.

In studies of speakers of Arbanasi Albanian, they stated to researchers that the language in Croatia is not stigmatised and they have not encountered issues due to speaking it. Arbanasi who speak Arbanasi Albanian mostly have a positive view of the language. Most Arbanasi speakers acknowledge the connections of their language with Albanian, however they stress the unique features of their language and independence from modern standard Albanian.

Contacts between some community members and people from Albania and Kosovo were established. In Croatia, there are recent attempts to salvage Arbanasi Albanian from language death. In 2016, standard modern Albanian was introduced as an optional language class in a Zadar high school in the neighbourhood of Arbanasi with the assistance from Albanian, Kosovo and Croatian authorities. Some disputes have arisen among the community over whether standard Albanian ought to be taught in the school system to keep their language alive or whether Arbanasi Albanian is better placed to fulfill that role instead.

Due to numerous contacts and intermarriage with local Albanians, the Arbanasi are learning more about their roots. An honored member of the community, Franco Marussich, is reconnecting the population to their ancestral land with an upcoming project on the genealogy of most families present in Zadar.

== Arbanasi dialect ==
The Gheg Albanian dialect spoken by the Arbanasi is quite unique among Albanian dialects. Among other features it has non-standard imperatives (art! instead of eja! for "come!", cf. past participle ardhur), lack of nasal vowels (peculiar for Gheg dialects), phonological changes including alternations between /s/ and /θ/ and the deletion of /h/, and the loss of trilled /r/. Arbanasi have a long history of interacting with speakers of three other languages, Italian, Croatian and Venetian. Historically, Arbanasi were often trilingual between Albanian, Croatian and Venetian; furthermore, they assimilated a large influx of Chakavian speakers who settled among them. There is a high volume of loanwords from each, but some changes appear to have instead distanced Arbanasi from these languages—this is the case with the replacement of all trilled /r/ (the only rhotic in all three of Croatian, Italian and Venetian) with an alveolar tap, a sound totally absent in all three of these influencers. In other ways Arbanasi behaves like a typical Gheg Albanian dialect.

== Notable people ==
=== Culture and the arts ===
==== Cinema ====
- Anita Berisha, Croatian actress
- Helena Bulaja, Croatian multimedia artist, director and producer
- Nera Stipičević, Croatian actress

==== Literature ====
- Niko Karuc, writer and publicist
- Kruno Krstić, lexicographer
- Josip Vladović Relja, writer

==== Music ====
- Pavle Dešpalj – music conductor and composer, member of HAZU
- Šime Dešpalj – composer, music teacher, writer
- Valter Dešpalj, cellist and professor at the Academy of Music, University of Zagreb
- Marie Kraja – Albanian opera singer
- Bepo Matešić – tenor singer
- Ennio Stipčević (b. 1959) - musicologist, member of HAZU
- Tomislav Ivcic
- Vedran Ivcic

=== Military ===
- Ivica Matešić Jeremija, writer, military diplomat and holder of the Order of Danica Hrvatska for culture
- Giovanni Renesi I (fl. 1568–1590), stratioti captain, who served with the Kingdom of Naples
- Giovanni Renesi II (1567–1624), military captain and mercenary who served the Venetian Republic until 1607

=== Politics and diplomacy ===
- Šime (Simeone) Duka, secretary of Vatican archives
- Valter Flego, Croatian politician, mayor of Buzet and prefect (Župan) of Istria County
- Gjon Gazulli, Albanian Dominican friar, humanist scholar, and diplomat
- Božidar Kalmeta, Croatian politician and member of the centre-right Croatian Democratic Union (HDZ) party
- Đani Maršan (b. 1944), singer, musician, diplomat and Croatian Consul
- Ivo Perović, Regent of Yugoslavia for the underage Peter II from 1934 to 1941
- Giacomo Vuxani, Albanian-Italian politician, Vice Prefect, Last Italian Authority of Zadar in 1944
- Josip Gjergja, a Croatian politician and diplomat, born on 11 February 1911 in Arbanasi, Zadar, and died on 18 February 1990 in Belgrade.

He joined the Communist Party of Yugoslavia (KPJ) in 1934 and was imprisoned from 1935 to 1938.
He served as the secretary of Agitprop of the Central Committee of the Communist Party of Croatia (CK KPH) from 1940 and actively participated in the anti-fascist struggle from 1941.
After World War II, he served as a Yugoslav ambassador to Albania, Bulgaria, Egypt, Libya, India, and Burma.
He also held the position of assistant to the Yugoslav Minister of Foreign Affairs from 1959 to 1963.
From 1963 to 1972, he was a member of the Federal Assembly of the Socialist Federal Republic of Yugoslavia (SFRJ), serving as Deputy President of the Federal Assembly from 1970 to 1972.
He resigned in 1972 due to disagreements with Josip Broz Tito's political stance on the purge of the leadership of the League of Communists of Croatia (SKH).

=== Religion ===
- Nikola Kekić, bishop of the Greek-Catholic Eparchy of Križevci
- Ivan Prenđa, Roman Catholic archbishop of the Archdiocese of Zadar
- Janko Šimrak, bishop of the Greek-Catholic Eparchy of Križevci

=== Sciences and education ===
- Ratimir Kalmeta, geographer and linguist
- Aleksandar Stipčević, archeologist and historian

=== Sport ===
- Ivan Bulaja, Croatian sailor and sailing trainer
- Tomislav Duka, Croatian footballer
- Edo Flego, Croatian footballer and football manager
- Josip Gjergja, Former Croatian basketball player
- Dario Gjergja, Croatian-Belgian basketball coach
- Hrvoje Macanović, sport journalist
- Teo Petani, Croatian basketball player
- Rok Stipčević, Croatian professional basketball player

== See also ==
- Names of the Albanians and Albania
- Albanians of Croatia
- Albanians of Romania
- Arbëreshë
- Arvanites

== Sources ==
- Barančić, Maximilijana (2008). "Arbanasi i etnojezični identitet". Croatica et Slavica Iadertina (in Croatian). 4 (4). Zadar: Croatica et Slavica Iadertina; Sveučilište u Zadru: 551–568. doi:10.15291/csi.627.
