= Arbanasi dialect =

Gheg Albanian dialect of Croatia

Arbanasi
- Arbënishtja
- Region: Croatia
- Ethnicity: Arbanasi
- Native speakers: 500 (2002)
- Language family: Indo-European: Albanoid; Albanian; Gheg; Northern; Northwestern; Arbanasi

Language codes
- ISO 639-3: –
- Glottolog: arba1240
- Linguasphere: 55-AAA-ab
- IETF: aln-HR
- A map showing Gheg speakers in green

- Arbanasi is classified as Severely Endangered by the UNESCO Atlas of the World's Languages in Danger

The Arbanasi dialect (natively: Arbëneshë) is a dialect of Gheg Albanian that is spoken in long-standing diaspora communities of Albanians in Croatia. Its speakers originated from the region of Kraja (now in modern Montenegro), and moved to Croatia in the early 18th century.

It is notable for a number of divergent developments as well as preservations of certain archaic features of Medieval Gheg Albanian. Slavic Croatian influences are present, as are Romance influences from Italian and Venetian.

The dialect may also be called the "Dalmatian dialect" of Albanian in some older publications.

== Phonology ==
=== Phonemes ===
- Unlike most Albanian dialects, both Tosk and Gheg, which have two r phonemes, an alveolar tap (/ɾ/) and an alveolar trill (/r/), Arbanasi only has one, the alveolar tap (/ɾ/). All instances that were originally rr (/r/) have merged into 'r' /ɾ/. This is the reverse from Croatian, Italian and Venetian, all three of which have a trill; the tap is available as a separate phoneme in Italian, while in Croatian it is an allophone of the trill.
- The Albanian palatals q and gj (/c/ and /ɟ/ respectively) have merged into "hard" affricates ç and xh (/t͡ʃ/ and /d͡ʒ/), as occurs in many Gheg dialects.
- Sporadic elimination of Albanian interdental fricatives th (/θ/) and dh (/ð/) (Albanian gjithë> Arbanasi gji), or shifting them respectively to /s/ and /l/. These sounds are absent in Croatian and Italian, though not in Venetian.
  - A /s/ to /θ/ shift sporadically as well: e thoj for Standard Albanian e saj.
- Gheg nasal vowels are denasalized.
- Deletion (apocope) of /h/ wherever it occurs. Note that Italian and Venetian, like most Romance languages, lack the sound.
- /a/ > /o/ in some contexts.

=== Other sound changes ===
- Word-final consonants are sporadically lost in Arbanasi.

== Morphology ==
Non-standard imperatives: art! for the imperative of vij ("to come", likely derived from the root of the past tense erdh- and/or the past participle ardhur, while the present tense is a partial borrowing from ancient Latin). In Standard Albanian, this would be eja!.

== Syntax ==
Romance influence is seen in the use of constructions of bëj ‘do’ + infinitive.

The infinitive is constructed in the standard Gheg fashion using me ('with').

== Lexicon ==
=== High frequency of loanwords ===
- Arbanasi contains a number of words borrowed directly from Venetian: buti, shtrancata, shola, shoto (cf. Italian sotto) etc.
- Loans from Croatian penetrate into the functional vocabulary: da (Croatian for 'that') used for 'that' instead of Albanian që, bash 'just' (instead of Albanian vetëm 'only').
- Other loans from Croatian: kral ('king', Croatian: kralj; Standard Albanian: mbret or Gheg regj, both from Latin), milo ('merciful', semantic shift from Croatian mila 'dear'), quditum 'astonished'.
- Loans from Italian rather than Venetian are also present: for example, apena ('as soon as') from Italian appena, inveqe ('on the contrary') from Italian invece.
- Loans from Italian via Croatian: kantat 'sung' (Standard Albanian: këndoj, itself a Latin loan).

== Example ==
Linguist At Justin Rrota in one of his works, gives an image of the Arbanasi dialect, that was given to him by Italian philologist Tagliavini:

"Ni njer e ko pat' ni gomar fort të plak, çish (që) nuk ko mujt' vish (srb. ma) me punua; përata ko shti në mendime m'e vra, e pe' (prej) likure të tij me bo tamburin. Ali (srb. por) gomari, çish ko marrë vesht gji(th), ni dit', kur nuk ko ken' kurkush në shpi, ko ik' në fusha Ullath (udhës) e ndeshën çenin, e i thot': Çish (çka) do me thanë da (srb. që) je ashtu i tuzno (srb. i idhun)?

(A man once had a very old donkey, who could not work anymore; because of that he had thoughts to kill him, and from his skin to cover his roof. But the donkey, who had heard of everything, one day, when nobody was home, ran away to the fields and on his way meets (his owners) dog, and the dog says: "What is it that you are so mad?"

== Sociolinguistics ==
The ancestors of Arbanasi people are Catholic Albanians who originated from the southern shore of Lake Shkodër and fled the Muslim-ruled Ottoman Empire to avoid military service and also due to religious discrimination or conversion to Islam. The Arbanasi arrived in Venetian-ruled Dalmatia and settled on the outskirts of Zadar on lands provided by landowner Erizzo, in four neighbouring villages and in the towns of Kotor, Dubrovnik and Zemunik. All other Arbanasi were assimilated, except in Zadar where a settlement formed that they called Arbënesh (for the Italians Borgo Erizzo, for the Croats Varoš Eričina), later becoming known in all local languages as Arbanasi. Arbanasi speakers have assimilated a large number of former Chakavian Croatian speakers who settled among them historically.

Arbanasi speakers are usually bilingual in Croatian, and historically they were trilingual, also speaking the Venetian language. Various factors contributed to the generational transmission of Arbanasi Albanian by Arbanasi speakers. One was an oral tradition in which Arbanasi Albanian was spoken at social gatherings, often attended by women who recited folk stories. Another was the sense of community awareness and linguistic difference from the more numerous surrounding Croatian speakers. Lastly was in situations of mixed marriages where a non-Arbanasi spouse from the area would be taught Arbanasi Albanian after becoming part of an Arbanasi household.

In the nineteenth and early twentieth century, Dalmatia was under Hapsburg rule. The establishment of a primary school in 1896 resulted in some Arbanasi receiving a mainly Italian-language education with some Croatian and two weekly lessons in Arbanasi Albanian. Another primary school existed teaching mostly in Croatian and in 1901, it made learning Arbanasi Albanian obligatory for students who had it as a mother tongue. After World War One, Zadar became part of Italy and during the interwar period, Arbanasi Albanian was at first tolerated and in later years banned from being spoken and taught in school. Zadar was incorporated into communist Yugoslavia in 1945 and Arbanasi Albanian was not taught by the school system.

The Arbanasi dialect, once spoken by much of the community and which served as a significant identity marker, has nearly disappeared among the Arbanasi due to the historical and political stigmatisation of Albanian in the former Yugoslavia and the recent period of globalisation. In independent Croatia, the language did not receive encouragement for years until the 2010s. Arbanasi Albanian is currently endangered, “with less than 200 fully competent speakers, although there are probably around 500 people that understand the language to some extent” (Kovačec 2002). Apart from a few publications like the journal Feja and collections of Arbanasi lore, the language is not written.

In studies of speakers of Arbanasi Albanian, they stated to researchers that the language in Croatia is not stigmatised and they have not encountered issues due to speaking it. Arbanasi who speak Arbanasi Albanian mostly have a positive view of the language. Most Arbanasi speakers acknowledge the connections of their language with Albanian, however they stress the unique features of their language and independence from modern standard Albanian. Among Arbanasi people who recognise Albanian origins, they view their language as an Albanian dialect as opposed to a language in its own right. Arbanasi born in the Italian interwar period have a higher likelihood to positively view Arbanasi as Albanian and connections their community share with Albania. Other Arbanasi who hold the position that they are only Croats also accept that their language is "a part of the Albanian language". A more common view among Arbanasi is that the Arbanasi language was historically linked to Albanian and over time it differed due to borrowings from Italian and Croatian.

Among the Arbanasi community, some have expressed concerns that they "need to beware of modern Albanian" and that cooperation with Albanians needs to be limited so the literary aspect of the Arbanasi idiom has an opportunity to develop. Arbanasi people who recognise their language as a type of Albanian Gheg feel that words should be drawn from it to fill gaps or substitute borrowed Italian and Croatian words used for objects or concepts of the modern period. Not all Arbanasi agree that the language should be taught, as some see it as a language of the private sphere among community members, whereas some others view the language as lacking the means for linguistic transmission. The teaching of Arbanasi is overall seen as a positive step by the community, although some prefer it is taught in a school course as opposed to a full school curriculum.

In Croatia, there have been recent attempts to salvage Arbanasi Albanian from language death. In 2016, standard modern Albanian was introduced as an optional language class in a Zadar high school in the neighbourhood of Arbanasi with the assistance from Albanian, Kosovo and Croatian authorities. Support exists among the Arbanasi for teaching standard Albanian at the high school for the national Albanian minority of Croatia. Some Arbanasi feel that the move is a political gesture by the Croatian government that is provocative as it misunderstood their needs of being a distinct community with a unique language. Some community members contest teaching standard Albanian as a substitute for Arbanasi, as they prefer it develops on its own terms, and discussions have centered upon possibly teaching the language outside the formal education system to keep it alive.
