= Helena Bulaja =

Croatian multimedia artist, director and animator

- Born: Helena Madunić; 6 December 1971 (age 54); Split, SR Croatia, SFR Yugoslavia (now Croatia)
- Occupations: Director, multimedia artist, animator, designer, producer, screenwriter
- Years active: 1995–present
- Works: Regoch, Mechanical Figures, The Cat Time Stories
- Website: http://www.helenabulaja.net/ http://www.bulaja.com/

Helena Bulaja (pronounced [buˈlaja]; born 6 December 1971) is a Croatian multimedia artist, film director, scriptwriter, designer and film producer.

== Biography ==
Helena Bulaja was born in Split, Croatia. She was educated in art history and comparative literature at the Faculty of Philosophy in Zagreb. She lives in Zagreb.

== Career ==
Bulaja has been active in digital art, design, art and film since 1994. In the early days of her career she worked as art director, designer and illustrator for several Croatian computer magazines (Computerworld Croatia, Net, Vidi), and in 1995 she started her digital artist career. In the 1990s, her interactive art projects, mostly concerned with metaphors, tele-presence and the relation of the real world to cyberspace, were featured in magazines such as Hotwired, and presented at Ars Electronica arts and technology festival's Net Art selection in Linz, Austria in 1997.

In 2000, Bulaja started an animated and interactive adaptation of fairytales from the book Priče iz davnine (Croatian Tales of Long Ago) written by Ivana Brlić-Mažuranić, a Croatian writer for children ("the Slavic Tolkien"), and based on Slavic mythology. Bulaja was the originator, editor-in-chief, manager, director and designer of the project. The project was presented at more than 30 international conferences and festivals dedicated to interactive media, animation and film, and won several awards, including the story category at the FlashForward Festival 2002 in San Francisco, the best multimedia award at Lucca Comics and Games in 2004, at the International Family Film Festival in 2007 in Hollywood, and the Zagreb City Award. The interactive animated project Croatian Tales of Long Ago explored the relationship between digital media and classical literature and was created by eight independent teams of authors from around the world (including Australia, Germany, France, USA, Canada, England, and Scotland) whose work was coordinated on the Internet. Contributors to the project included Nathan Jurevicius, Christian Biegai, Alistair Keddie, Laurence Arcadias, Ellen McAuslan, Mirek and Paulina Nisenbaum, Sabina Hahn, Edgar Beals, Katrin Rothe, Brenda Hutchinson, Leon Lučev, Sabina Hahn, and Erik Adigard. Each of the eight teams transferred one of the eight fairy tales from Brlić's original book to digital media, with complete artistic and creative freedom.

Since 2006, Bulaja has been developing the experimental interactive documentary Mechanical Figures with an international team of authors. The project was inspired by the Serbian-American scientist and inventor Nikola Tesla. The film will be released in different media: as a linear theatric and TV documentary, a series of short films, as well as an interactive film for the Web and mobile devices such as iPhone and iPad. In the film, stories and thoughts about Tesla and creativity are told by some of the most intriguing and inspiring artists, thinkers, writers and scientists, like the film director Terry Gilliam, musician and artist Laurie Anderson, performance artist Marina Abramović, writer Christopher Priest, new media theorist Douglas Rushkoff, actor Andy Serkis, and Kyoto University president Hiroshi Matsumoto. The project is also questioning film as an art form in the time of technological development and the new media, and it leads the viewer through the process of creation, following Tesla's legacy around the world from Zagreb through London, Paris, Budapest, New York City, to Tokyo and New Zealand. The project won MEDIA support for development, as first Croatian documentary film project.

Bulaja is also developing an animated project for TV and interactive media, The Cat Time Stories, which also won MEDIA development support as first Croatian animation project, based on short stories about cats and people written by Croatian writer Nada Horvat. The project was selected and presented at Cartoon Forum in September 2010 in Sopron, Hungary.
