= Aleksandar Stipčević =

Croatian historian (1930–2015)

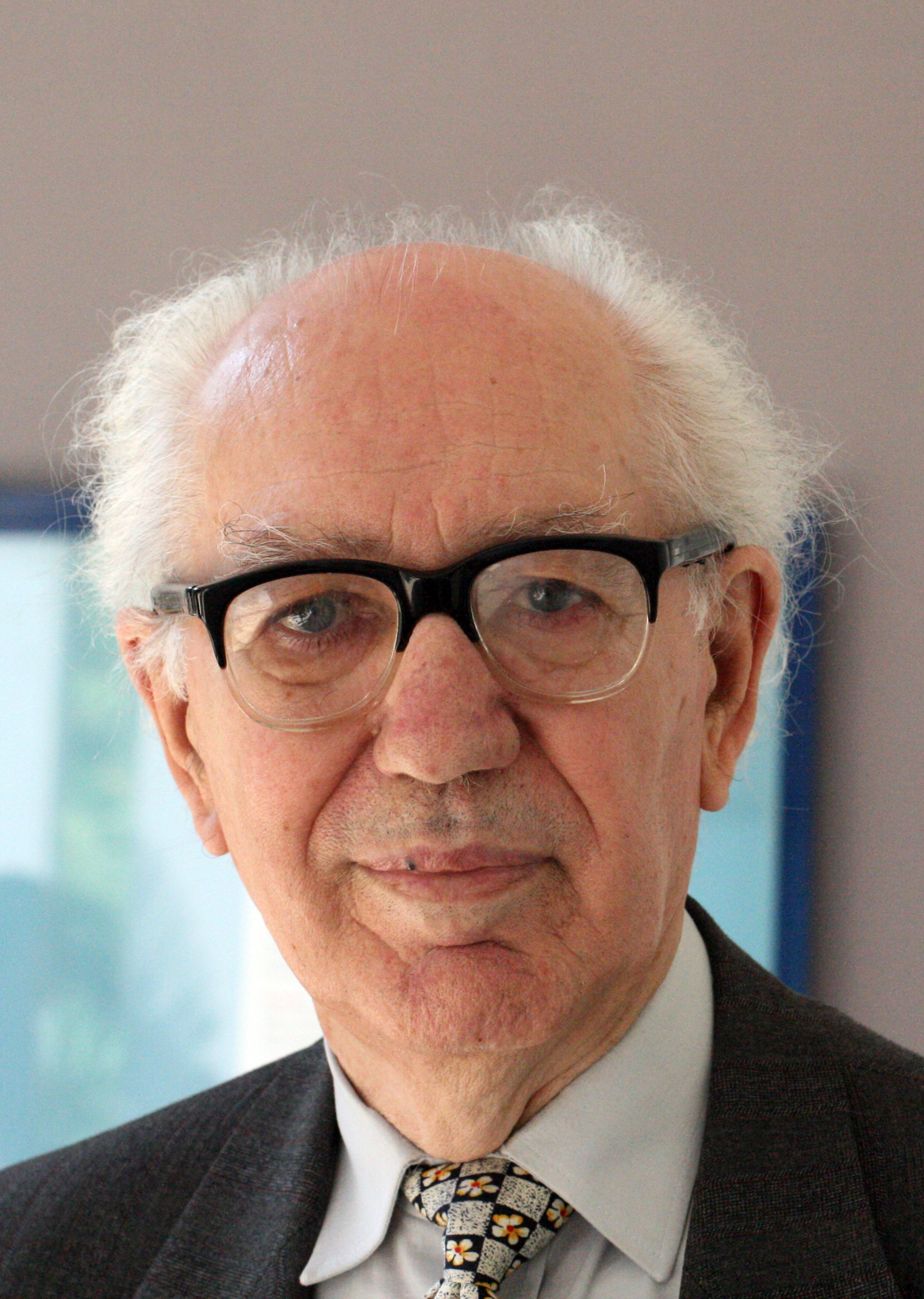
- Born: 10 October 1930; Arbanasi, Zadar, Kingdom of Italy
- Died: 1 September 2015 (aged 84); Zagreb, Croatia
- Known for: Studies on Illyrians
- Awards: Order of Skanderbeg
- Scientific career
- Fields: Archaeology, history
- Institutions: University of Zagreb

Aleksandar Stipčević (10 October 1930 – 1 September 2015) was an Arbanas Croatian archeologist, bibliographer, librarian and historian of Albanian origin who specialized in the study of the Illyrians.

He was born in the village of Arbanasi near Zadar, Croatia (then Zara, Kingdom of Italy), a member of the local Arbanasi community. From 1970 to 1973, in the capacity of a senior lecturer, as an external collaborator, he taught 'Introduction to Archaeology' at the Faculty of Philosophy in Pristina. He was a full professor at the University of Zagreb from 1987 until his retirement in 1997. He was a member of the Academy of Sciences and Arts of Kosovo.

His 1974 book Iliri ("The Illyrians") has been translated into English, Italian and Albanian. He was awarded the Order of Skanderbeg by Albania.

== Works ==
- Gli Iliri ("Illyrians"; 1966)
- Arte degli Illiri ("The Illyrian Art"; 1963)
- Iliri: povijest, život, kultura (1974)
- Bibliografija antičke arheologije u Jugoslaviji (I–II, 1977)
- Kultni simboli kod Ilira ("The Illyrian Cult Symbols"; 1981)
- Povijest knjige ("The History of Books"; 1985, extended edition in 2006)
- Cenzura u knjižnicama ("Censorship and Libraries"; 1992)
- O savršenom cenzoru (1994)
- Sudbina knjige (2000)
- Socijalna povijest knjige u Hrvata (I–III, 2004–08)
- Tradicijska kultura zadarskih Arbanasa (2011)

Some of them are translated to other languages.

He was the editor-in-chief of the second volume of the Croatian Biographical Lexicon (1983–1989).
