= Giacomo Vuxani =

Giacomo of Arbanasi

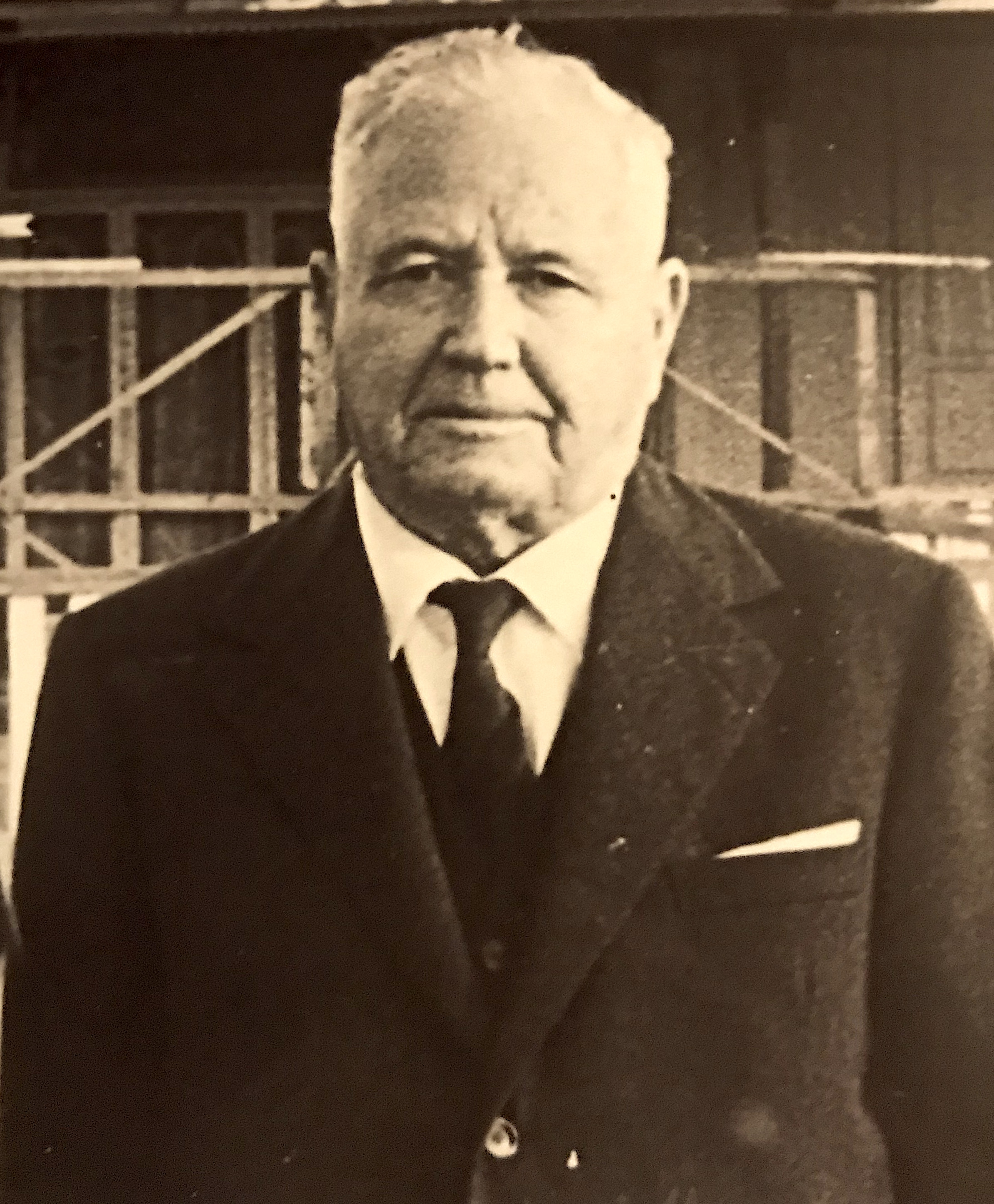
Giacomo Vuxani

Giacomo Vuxani (Arbanasi, July 20, 1886 – Trieste, April 7, 1964) was an Arbanasi politician born in the Arbanasi village of Borgo Erizzo (now Arbanasi), a suburb of Zadar.

After attending classical grammar school, he enrolled in the Faculty of Law at the University of Graz in 1910, and from 1916 to 1918 he was assigned to the command of operations of the Austro-Hungarian army in Albania where he performed the functions of interpreter. In May 1919, he took up service in the Prefecture of Zadar and in that same year he participated in "Impresa di Fiume" as a volunteer. In 1937 he was awarded the title of Cavaliere dell'Ordine della Corona d'Italia.

The Italian government sent him to Albania in 1940 on an organizational mission and in 1942 he took on the duties of Permanent Councilor at the "Ministero delle Terre Liberate", governed by Eqrem Vlora. On April 16, 1943, he resumed service at the Prefecture of Zadar. When the Anglo-American air bombings of December 16 and December 30, 1943, razed a large part of the city to the ground, Vuxani remained in his place as Prefectural Commissioner to the Municipality and took care of the population.

On October 28, 1944, Prefect Coceani from the Trieste commune sent a telegram to Zadar, in which the Ministry of the Interior of Salò ordered the Head of the Province Serrentino to abandon the city. Vuxani remained the last Italian authority in Zadar when it was occupied by the Yugoslav troops on 31 October 1944. Arrested the next day on 1 November, he was put to trial several times and sentenced to death, but in the end the partisans decided to free him by delivering him on Christmas Eve to his son-in-law Giovanni Minak.

After being freed, against all caution, he continued to care for the Italian population and, following his courageous interventions, repatriated about 950 Italians from Zadar from January - June 1947. In 1948 he obtained the decree of Italian citizenship and, following the options provided by the Treaty of Peace, he returned to Italy bringing with him the "Gonfalone di Zara" (Coat of Arms of Zadar). After a brief period in the refugee camp of Massa, he resumed service at the Prefecture of Ferrara, and later at the Prefecture of Trieste until 1955.
