= Albanians in Croatia =

Croats of partial or full Albanian ancestry

Albanians of Croatia
Total population
- Croatia 17,513 (2011)

Regions with significant populations
- Zagreb: 4,292
- Primorje-Gorski Kotar: 2,410
- Istria County: 2,393
- Split-Dalmatia: 1,025
- Zagreb County: 921
- Zadar County: 908

Languages
- Albanian, Croatian

Religion
- Christianity; Islam; Irreligion

Related ethnic groups
- Other Albanians

The Albanians of Croatia (Albanian: Shqiptarët në Kroaci; Croatian: Albanci u Hrvatskoj) are people of full or partial Albanian ancestry and heritage who are an ethnic minority in Croatia.

They are an autochthonous national minority recognized by the Constitution of Croatia. As such, they elect a special representative to the Croatian Parliament, shared with members of four other national minorities. The Albanian language is recognised in Croatia.

In the 2011 Croatian census, there were 17,513 Albanians living in Croatia, 0.41% of total population. The largest religious groups among the Albanians were Muslims (9,594 or 54.8% of them) and Catholics (7,109 or 40.6% of them). Arbanasi subgroup, in particular are Roman Catholic of Eastern Orthodox Christians.

In the 1712/14 census done in Lika and Krbava among Vlach population, and other documents, many surnames with Albanian and Arbanasi word roots were recorded, such as those with suffixes "-aj" (e.g. Bulaja, Mataija, Šolaja, Saraja, Suknajić, Rapajić), "-ez" (Kokez, Kekez, Ivez, Malez etc.), and others (Šimleša, Šimrak, Šinđo/a/n, Šintić, Kalember, Flego, Macura, Cecić, Kekić, Zotović etc.).

Albanians arrived in the territory of modern Croatia in waves during various historical periods, primarily as war refugees and nomadic pastoralists. In the Middle Ages they lived in coastal cities and some were assimilated with Vlachs. In the 17th and 18th century, the Arbanasi people settled the area around Zadar, and in modern time they arrived as immigrants or war refugees. Some people in Croatia descended from earlier waves of Albanian migration bear surnames of linguistically Albanian origin, but do not identify as ethnic Albanians, do not speak Albanian and are therefore not considered to be part of the group.

== Demographics ==
The 2011 census shows that at that time 17,513 Albanians lived in Croatia. This corresponds to 0.41% of the population. In 2001, the proportion of 15,082 persons had only 0.34%.

Of these, 9,594 (54.8%) are Muslims and 7,109 (40.6%) are Catholics. 17 belong to other Christian denominations and the remaining 793 (4.5%) are partly atheists, partly agnostics, give no indication with respect to religion or belong to other religions.

Albanians are concentrated in Istria (2,393), Dalmatia (1,025), Zadar (908) and in the north of the Croatian coast (2,410) as well as in the capital Zagreb (4,292). More live in smaller numbers scattered throughout Croatia.

Counties or region	Albanians 2001	% 2001	Albanians 2011	% 2011
Zagreb City	3,389	0.43%	4,292	0.54%
Primorje-Gorski Kotar County	2,063	0.68%	2,410	0.81%
Istria County	2,032	0.98%	2,393	1.15%
Split-Dalmatia County	900	0.19%	1,025	0.23%
Osijek-Baranja County	858	0.26%	865	0.28%
Zagreb County	835	0.27%	921	0.29%
Bjelovar-Bilogora County	755	0.57%	743	0.62%
Zadar County	629	0.39%	908	0.63%
Sisak-Moslavina County	511	0.28%	576	0.33%
Vukovar-Srijem County	487	0.24%	492	0.27%
Dubrovnik-Neretva County	328	0.27%	408	0.33%
Šibenik-Knin County	322	0.29%	379	0.35%
Varaždin County	304	0.16%	264	0.15%
Karlovac County	300	0.21%	340	0.26%
Koprivnica-Križevci County	285	0.23%	249	0.22%
Brod-Posavina	285	0.16%	315	0.20%
Virovitica-Podravina County	229	0.25%	234	0.28%
Međimurje	185	0.16%	200	0.18%
Požega-Slavonia County	146	0.17%	196	0.25%
Krapina-Zagorje County	129	0.09%	132	0.10%
Lika-Senj County	110	0.20%	171	0.34%
Croatia	15,082	0.34%	17,513	0.41%

== History ==
=== Early history ===
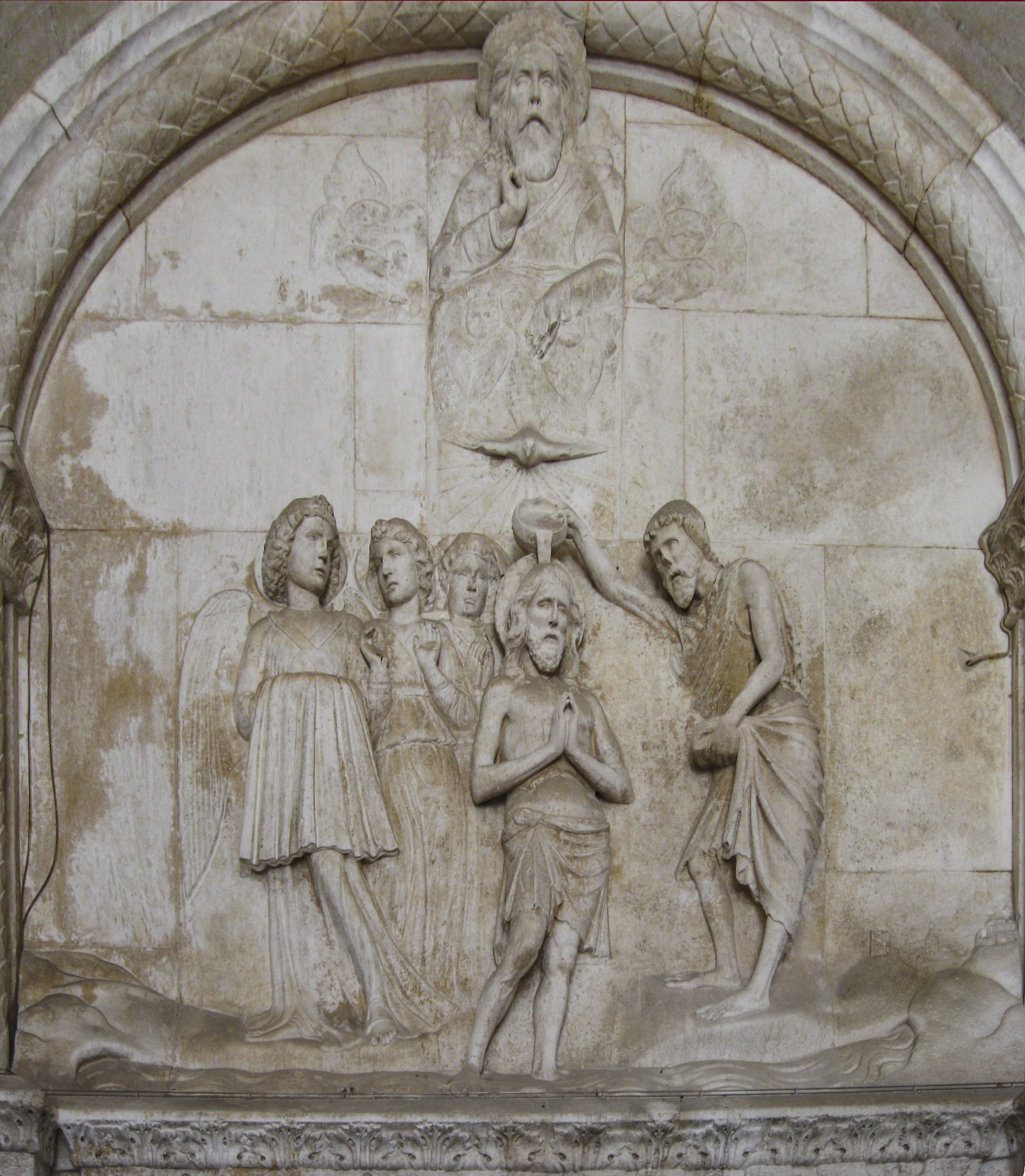
The relief of the entrance of the Cathedral of Trogir worked by Andrea Nikollë Aleksi.

Some of them came to Croatian lands at the time of Venetian rule because in parts of Croatia and Albania were under the rule of the Venetian Republic. Thus through the internal migration, the Albanian families also migrated, of which a large number was croatianized over the centuries to come. Internal migration has been of economic nature.

Another period is the time of liberation wars against the Ottomans when Christian Albanian families migrated to the liberated territories of Croatia.

The Arbanasi (Albanian also Arbëreshët e Zarës "Albanians of Zadar") are a small population group in Croatia still existing today. They are Catholic Albanians who fled the Ottomans between 1726 and 1733 in the Croatian coastal country, where they are still present today. In the city of Zadar they founded their own named after them district, which persists to this day. The Arbanasi traditionally speak a different dialect of Albanian.

The original Albanian inhabitants of Catholic faith Peroj (Albanian Përrua) in Pula, who fled from the Ottomans in 1657, have given up their Albanian nationality.

=== Modern history ===
At the time of Yugoslavia, Albanians migrated to Croatia for economic and political reasons, especially after 1945. Albanian migrants were mainly from Kosovo and North Macedonia. Some Albanians came in as the spouses of Janjevci Croats from Kosovo.

Traditionally, Croatian Albanians have been involved with jewelry, filigree, bakery and restaurant management, such as bakeries and confectioners.

According to the Association of Volunteers of the Homeland War, 2,579 Albanian volunteers fought in the Croatian Army and various Croat paramilitary units during the Croatian War for Independence, with losses of 86 killed, 37 missing and more than 500 injured. Among the Albanians who fought during the war were the generals Rahim Ademi and Agim Çeku.

== Politics ==
The only political party representing Albanians in Croatia is the Union of Albanians of Croatia (Albanian: Unioni i Shqiptarëve të Kroacisë, Croatian: Unija Albanaca u Hrvatskoj, UAH), led by Ermina Lekaj Prljaskaj, who served as the representative of Albanian minority in Croatian parliament from 2015 to 2024.

== See also ==
- Arbanasi
- Albanian diaspora
- Albania-Croatia relations
- Ethnic groups in Croatia
