= Battle of Rome (1944) =

Engagement of the World War II

- Part of the Italian campaign of World War II
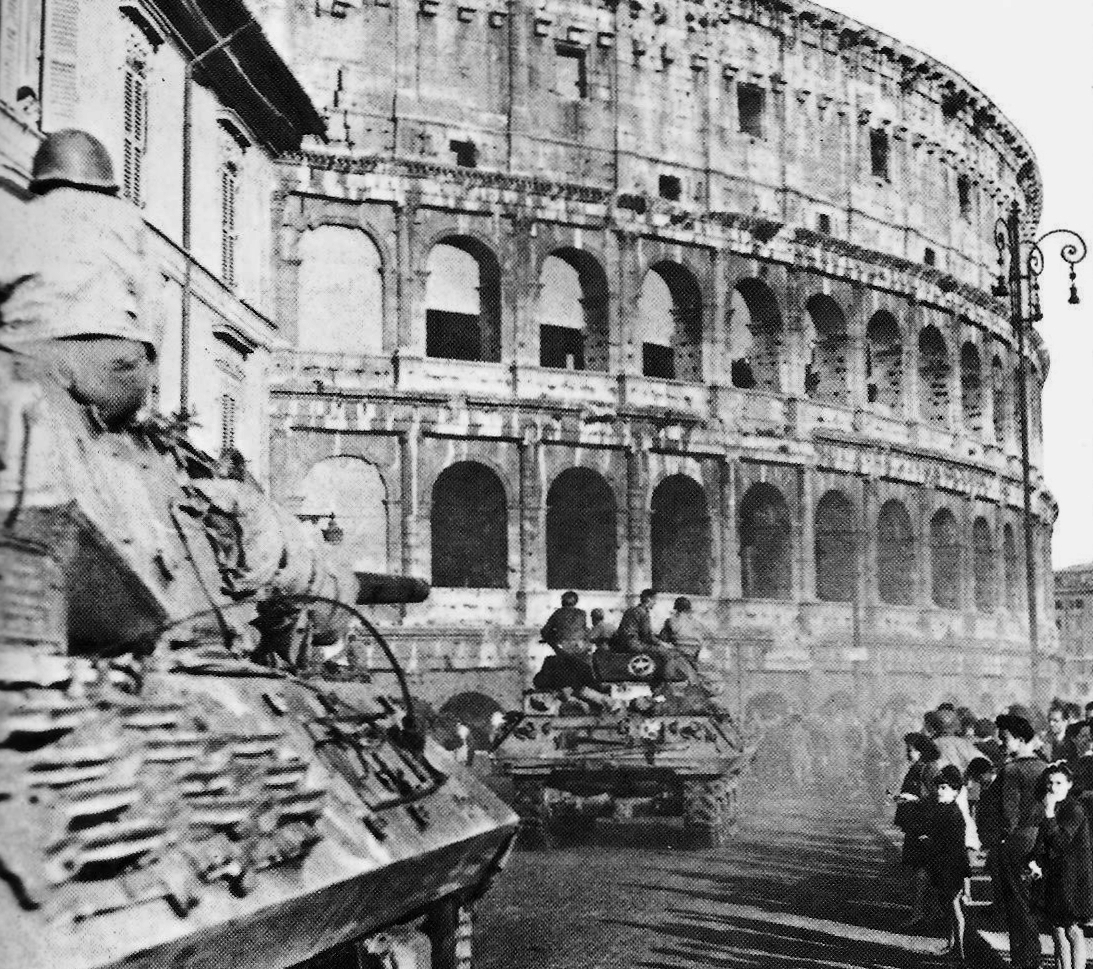
- Allied armoured vehicles parade past the Colosseum on June 5, 1944
| Date | 4 – 5 June 1944 |
| Location | Rome, modern day Italy (then Kingdom of Italy) 41°53′36″N 12°28′58″E |
| Result | Allied victory |

Belligerents
| United Kingdom; United States; Italy; Italian Partisans; Free France | Germany; Italian Social Republic |

Commanders and leaders
| (United Kingdom) Harold Alexander; (United States) Mark W. Clark; (Kingdom of Italy) Giovanni Messe; (Free France) Alphonse Juin Ughetto Group (Note: This was the group of five 13 year old boys and a 21 year old man led by 13 year old Ugo Forno which prevented the Germans from advancing through Rome-Florence railway bridge however in doing so all of the boys were either killed or severally wounded) : (Kingdom of Italy) Ugo Forno †; Francesco Guidi †; Luciano Curzi †; Sandro Fornari (WIA); Vittorio Seboni † | (Nazi Germany) Albert Kesselring; (Nazi Germany) Eberhard von Mackensen; (Nazi Germany) Herbert Kappler; (Nazi Germany) Kurt Mälzer; (Nazi Germany) Alfred Schlemm; (Nazi Germany) Traugott Herr; (Italian Social Republic) Rodolfo Graziani; (Italian Social Republic) Mario Carloni; (Italian Social Republic) J.V. Borghese |

Strength
| Unknown | Unknown |

Casualties and losses
| Heavy | Minimal |
- ~52,000 civilians killed. Nazi SS also killed Italian prisoners captured during the Italian campaign
- Location within Mediterranean Battle of Rome (1944) (Italy)

The Liberation of Rome also known as Battle of Rome was one of the main episodes of the Italian campaign during the Second World War. On June 4 and 5, 1944, American troops under General Mark Wayne Clark managed to break through the German army's last defensive lines and entered the city without encountering resistance, receiving an enthusiastic welcome from the Roman population. Field Marshal Albert Kesselring, commander of the Wehrmacht in Italy, preferred to retreat north without engaging in combat within the urban area of Rome.

== Background ==
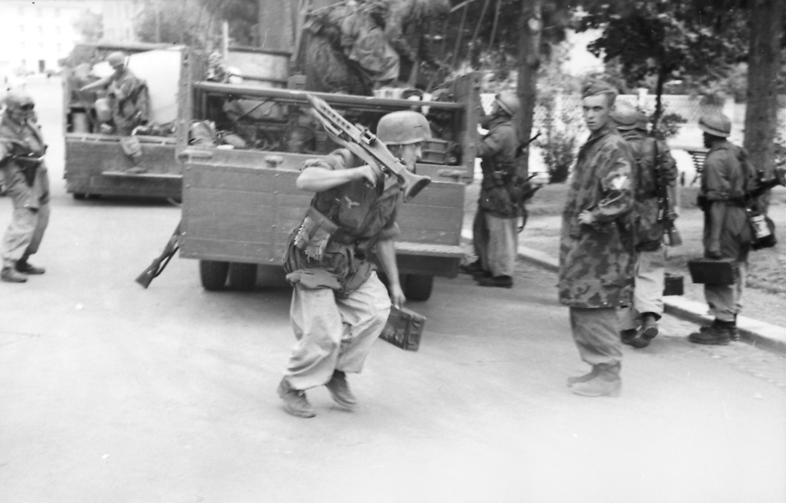
German paratroopers in Corso Trieste during the disarming of the Piave Division, following the end of the fighting.

General Vittorio Ambrosio, chief of the General Staff of the Italian armed forces, gave the first operational directives for the concentration of forces around Rome on 21 July 1943, even before the dismissal of Benito Mussolini following the events of 25 July; on that date, in fact, the so-called "Motorcycle Army Corps" was formed, which, consisting of three mobile divisions, was to protect the capital; General Giacomo Carboni assumed command of this new formation. The provisions of the Supreme Command stipulated that General Carboni's mobile unit was officially to defend Rome in the event of Allied landings on the Lazio coast, but in reality General Ambrosio, a participant in King Victor Emmanuel III's plans to remove Mussolini, intended above all to have well-equipped troops to prevent possible German-backed "Fascist countermeasures".

The "failed defense" occurred as a result of a series of contexts (actions and decisions of the political and military leadership) that rendered the fighting futile, which in any case began independently as early as the evening of 8 September and on the 10th also recorded the participation of civilians.

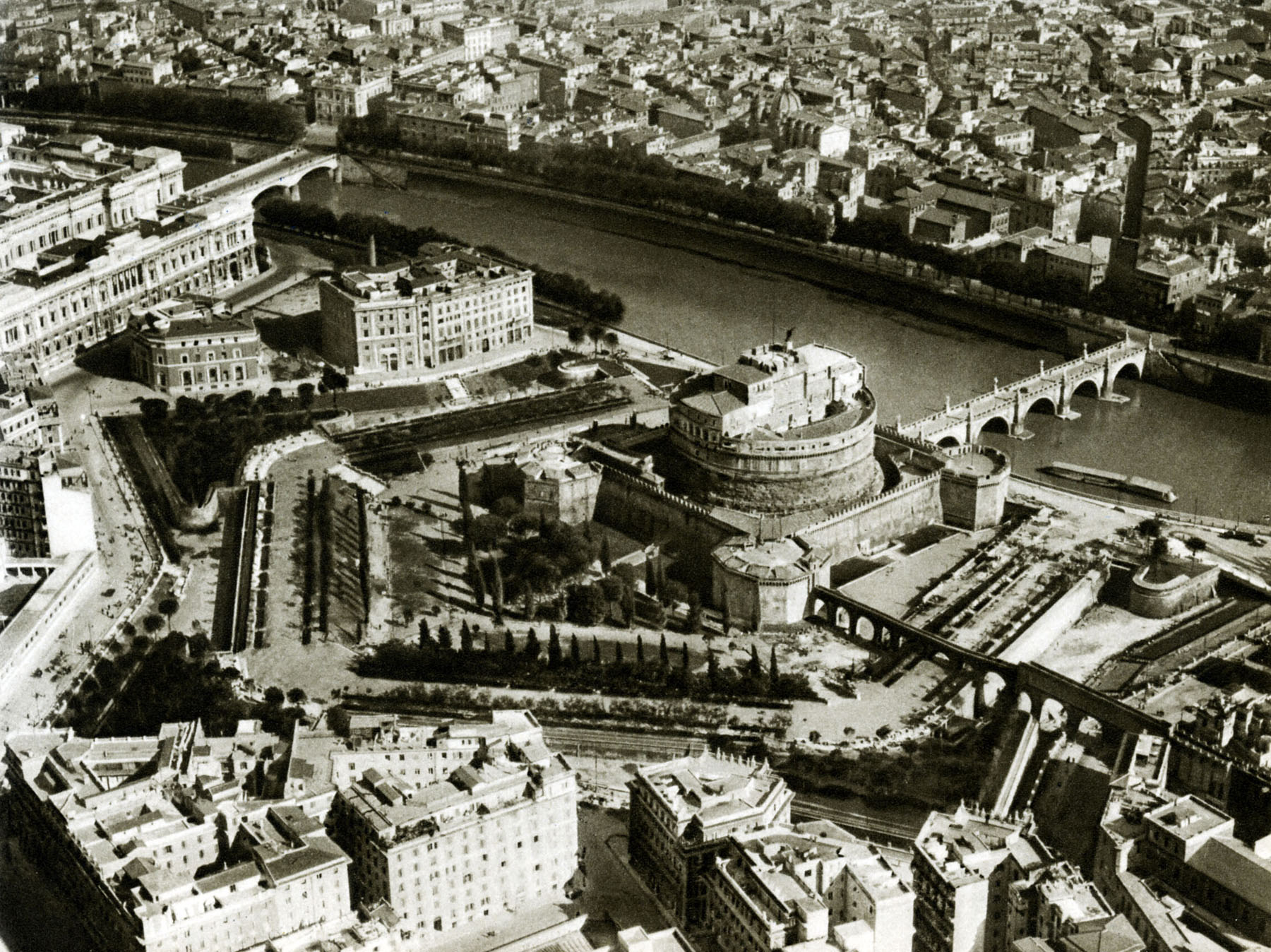
The center of Rome in an aerial view from 1938

Beginning on 9 September 1943, some units of the Regular Army attempted to prevent the Germans from occupying Rome; alongside the Italian soldiers fought a few hundred civilians, who largely rushed in a spontaneous and uncoordinated manner in order to attempt a last, and almost desperate, defense of the city; among the civilian casualties (241 according to the official tally, about 400 according to another assessment) the best known is Raffaele Persichetti. According to other estimates, 414 Italian soldiers and 183 civilians were killed in the fighting in those days, supported by units and divisions of the Motor Armored Corps and the Capital Defense, which were also joined by handfuls of private citizens.

After suffering some losses, the Germans briefly took over the capital. The unacceptable risk on the German side of seeing its forces involved for a long time in the battle for Rome, instead of being free to move quickly to the Allied beachhead at Salerno was skillfully avoided by Kesselring by engaging in negotiations with the Italian military authorities and taking advantage of the chaos within them brought about by the abandonment of command posts by most politicians and generals, followed by a deceptive "peaceful cohabitation" agreement, soon betrayed with the complete occupation of the capital by the Wehrmacht. Rome came nominally under the government of the Italian Social Republic, which was formed on 23 September 1943, but in fact was in the hands of the German military authorities, who intended in this way to exploit its great political and military value to the full. The political climate and the feelings of the population were oriented in an anti-fascist and anti-Nazi direction.

The Germans, well aware of the political value of Rome, with the presence of the Vatican, attempted to make propagandistic use of the merely formal and never recognized "open city" declaration issued by the Badoglio government, which had unilaterally declared Rome an "open city" thirty hours after the second Allied bombardment of the capital on 13 August 1943. On 11 September the military commander, General Calvi di Bergolo, issued a communiqué stating that German troops were to remain outside the city's territory; however, on the same day Field Marshal Kesselring declared that Rome was part of the war territory, that the city was subject to the German rules of war, that "strike organizers, saboteurs and sharpshooters [would] be shot," and that the Italian authorities were to "prevent all acts of sabotage and passive resistance."

== Battle ==
"I know of interests and machinations to have the British Eighth Army take Rome... if Alexander even tries such a thing, he will have another pitched battle on his hands against me."

— Mark W. Clark

"We not only wanted the honor of taking the city, but we believed we deserved it... not only did we want to become the first army in fifteen centuries to take Rome from the south, but we wanted the locals to know that it was the Fifth Army that had accomplished the feat."

— Mark W. Clark

=== The Germans in Rome ===
The armistice of September 1943 and the consequent rapid and brutal reaction of the German army in Italy had caused a catastrophe in the Italian political, administrative, civil and military structure; in just a few days the Wehrmacht had occupied a large part of the peninsula and had disarmed and captured hundreds of thousands of soldiers of the Italian Royal Army.

On the evening of 8 September, German forces attacked Rome. The following day, while fighting raged in the city between the Wehrmacht and the Royal Army, King Victor Emmanuel III and the head of the government, Marshal Pietro Badoglio, hastily abandoned the capital and took refuge in Brindisi. The Italian leaders were counting above all on the help of the Allies under General Dwight Eisenhower, who had crossed into Calabria since 3 September 1943 and landed in force at Salerno on 9 September. Field Marshal Albert Kesselring, commander of the German forces in central and southern Italy, had managed to control the situation with great skill; the Anglo-Americans who landed at Salerno were blocked and suffered heavy losses and the Germans carried out a methodical retreat north of Naples. On 11 September 1943, after three days of fierce fighting, Rome capitulated.

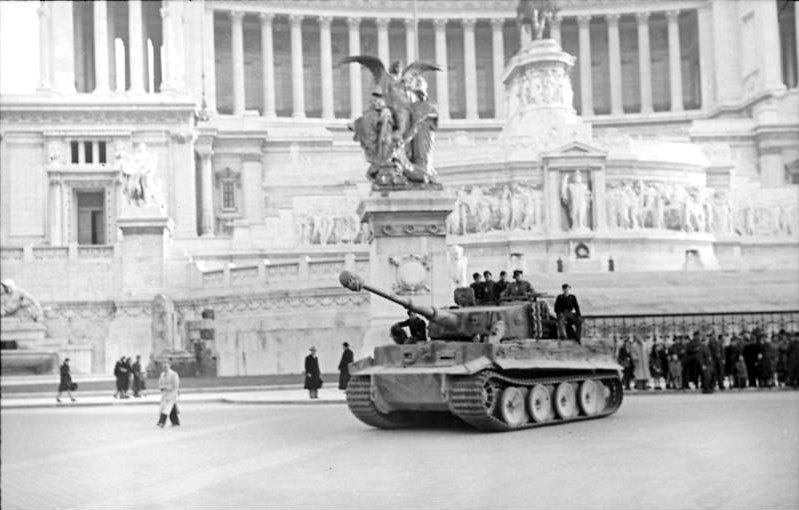
A German Tiger I tank in front of the Vittoriano in February 1944

Despite dubious promises to General Giorgio Calvi di Bergolo to consider Rome an open city, Field Marshal Kesselring quickly took draconian measures to ensure German control of the capital; with the order posted on the walls of the city on the evening of 11 September 1943, the German commander declared that the city was a "war territory" subject to German laws of war, that "any strike was prohibited", that any resistance fighters would be "summarily judged and shot"; the Field Marshal affirmed that he was "determined to ensure calm and discipline". In a short time, while the German army gradually managed to halt the Allied advance on the line of the Garigliano, Liri and Sangro rivers, on the so-called Gustav Line, the Nazi occupation and repression structure was organised in Rome with the support of the collaborationist political-military authorities of the Italian Social Republic. German control over the capital was coordinated by the "Commander of the City of Rome", first General Rainer Stahel and then General Kurt Mälzer, by the head of the diplomatic mission, Eitel Friedrich Moellhausen, by the head of the police and SS in Rome, Obersturmbannführer Herbert Kappler.

=== Occupation and resistance ===
In a dark atmosphere of misery, repression and violence, the Roman population had to suffer the harsh regime of occupation. On 6 October 1943 (Deportation of the Roman Carabinieri) Minister Rodolfo Graziani ordered the disarmament of all the Carabinieri in service in the capital (around four thousand men); the following day, an estimated figure of between fifteen hundred and two thousand five hundred soldiers of the force were deported to Germany, the remainder having gone into hiding and also joined the ranks of the Clandestine Military Front of the Carabinieri (FMCC, also known as the Clandestine Resistance Front of the Carabinieri) organised by General Filippo Caruso. On 16 October 1943 the great operation of rounding up and deportation of the Roman Jews took place without Pope Pius XII and the Vatican authorities, still concentrated on a policy of equidistance and the search for an agreement between the Anglo-Americans and the Germans with an anti-communist function, being able to intervene with any concrete results. The first activities of the Roman Resistance and of numerous secret agents hindered the Nazi-Fascist control of the capital, but the hopes of a rapid liberation with the arrival of the Allies vanished in November 1943.

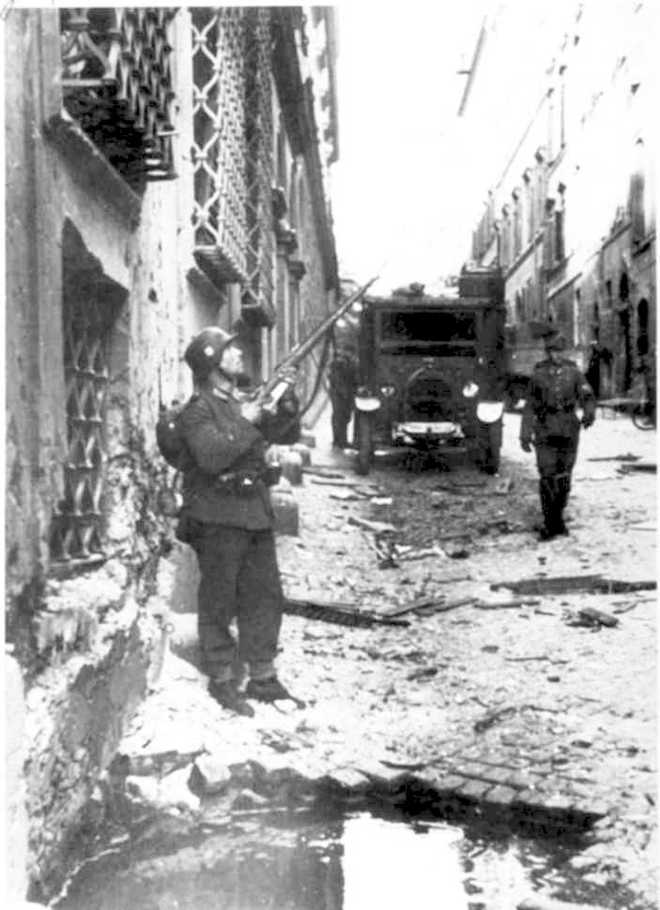
German soldiers in Via Rasella immediately after the attack on 23 March 1944

By the end of the month it became clear that due to the difficulties of the terrain, the inclement autumn weather and, above all, the tenacious and skillful defence of the German troops of Field Marshal Kesselring, the Allied forces would not be able to overcome in a short time the positions of the Gustav Line, centred on the strategic position of Cassino. General Mark Wayne Clark was the commander of the 5th American Army which had landed at Salerno on 9 September 1943 and had faced hard and bloody fighting to advance a few dozen kilometres beyond the Volturno. The general, resolute and ambitious, was absolutely determined to conquer Rome at all costs and emulate Belisarius, the only conqueror of the city by advancing from the south; despite the failures of the autumn, he was completely focused on this objective and felt resentment and a heated rivalry with the British generals, to whom he attributed the desire to steal from him the glory of entering Rome first with his troops. General Clark also had little confidence in Winston Churchill, who was apparently the only one of the Big Three in favour of continuing the Italian campaign, but whom he believed was mainly committed to favouring the British Army at the expense of his own.

On 22 January 1944, to overcome the exhausting stalemate on the Gustav Line and under pressure from the confident British Prime Minister Churchill, they landed at Anzio, on the coast south of Rome, initially encountering weak resistance in the first hours it seemed that the way was open for a rapid advance to Rome. Euphoria and the expectation of an imminent liberation spread among the population and within the Resistance groups; plans for an insurrection were drawn up. In reality, in a short time the situation changed completely the landed Anglo-American troops, instead of advancing, remained stationary to consolidate the bridgehead and gave Field Marshal Kesselring time to bring in powerful reserve forces and counterattack; the Nazi-Fascist repressive apparatus in Rome went into action and hit the Resistance groups hard.

While the German counterattacks at Anzio were eventually repelled by the Anglo-American troops, who nevertheless remained blocked for months in the narrow bridgehead bombarded by enemy artillery, General Clark's attempts to break through the Gustav Line failed completely. The Allied offensives of January and March 1944 against the stronghold of Cassino ended in costly failures. During this phase of attrition in the fighting on the front, the Roman Resistance tried to react to the repression and launched the hardest attack on the German occupier with the bloody attack in Via Rasella on 23 March 1944, which triggered the very harsh reprisal of the Ardeatine Caves, immediately demanded by Hitler and approved by Field Marshal Kesselring, General Eberhard von Mackensen and General Mälzer.

=== Montecassino and Operation Diadem ===
In April 1944, General Clark, deeply shaken by repeated failures, secretly returned to the United States, where he remained for two weeks. The American leaders explained to the general the Allied planning Operation Overlord, the major landing in France, was scheduled for June 5, and it would be propaganda-wise important for American troops to have managed to liberate Rome before that date. General Clark, still determined, also out of personal ambition, to conquer Rome, returned to Italy, determined to launch a new offensive. At the same time, Winston Churchill and General Harold Alexander, commander of all Allied forces in Italy, also intended to resume operations against the Gustav Line; they aimed to achieve a major strategic success and continue the campaign in Italy, possibly avoiding the planned landing in Provence, which was considered useless and costly. During the spring, several fresh Anglo-American divisions arrived at the front, while General John Harding , General Alexander's Chief of Staff, planned the new offensive, codenamed Operation Diadem.

General Harding's plan called for the secret transfer of a large part of General Oliver Leese's British Eighth Army, which was to play the main role in the great offensive, to the Cassino front. General Leese's army, consisting of 300,000 British, Canadian, New Zealand, Indian, and Polish soldiers, would attack along the Liri Valley. General Clark's Fifth Army, with 170,000 soldiers from General Geoffrey Keyes' II Corps and General Alphonse Juin's French Expeditionary Force, would concentrate in a narrow sector just thirty-two kilometers south of Cassino and attack between the Tyrrhenian coast and the mountainous terrain of the Aurunci Mountains. In the Anzio-Nettuno beachhead, General Lucian K. Truscott's VI Corps, reinforced with new divisions, would later go on the offensive towards the Alban Hills to intercept the German lines of retreat.

=== Arrival of General Clark's American troops ===
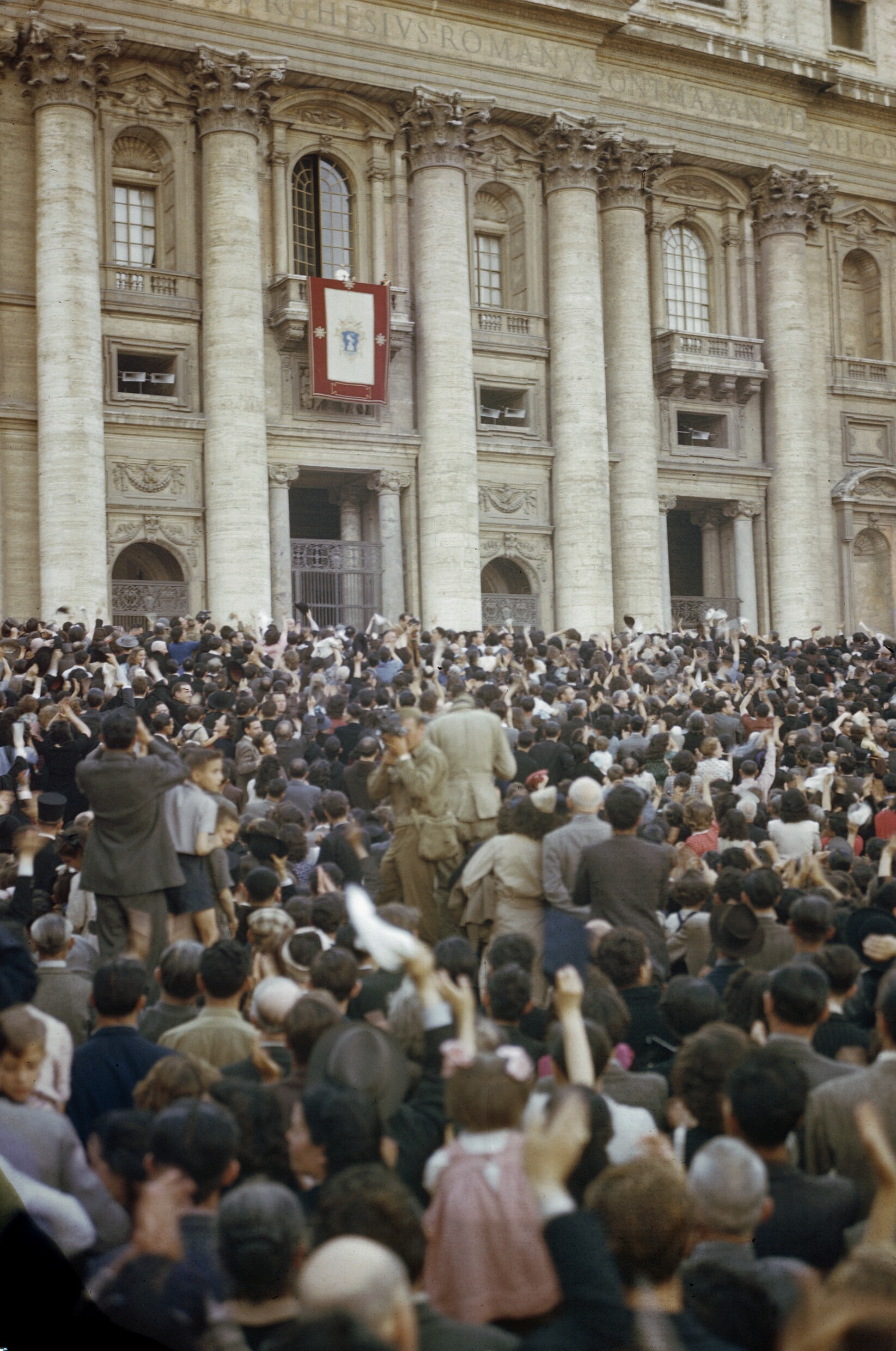
Crowds gathered in St. Peter's Square to hear Pope Pius XII after the arrival of Allied troops, 5 June 1944

After the breakthrough in the Cassino sector and in the Anzio and Nettuno beachhead sector, the German commander, Field Marshal Albert Kesselring, implemented a retreat of his forces to the Gothic Line, thus abandoning Rome, which Italy had long proclaimed an open city, but which the Germans had continued to use as a headquarters and troops as well as a communications and transport hub. The city was finally liberated on June 4, 1944, by the U.S. 5th Army, coming from the Tyrrhenian sector. Together with the Americans also arrived the "R contingent" of the Italian Carabinieri, which later merged with the clandestine front of the Carabinieri in Rome, restoring the territorial command.

=== Battle for Rome ===
The renunciation of carrying out a house-to-house battle and the hasty retreat of the Nazis from Rome was also due to the well-known combativeness of the Roman resistance fighters and partisans, who during the occupation had carried out the most sensational urban attack against the Germans (the attack in Via Rasella) and had left on the ground, from 8 September 1943 to 4 June 1944, approximately 1,700 fallen, while ten thousand Romans were deported to Germany. The diplomat Eugen Dollmann, a member of the SS, wrote in his memoirs, after the liberation, that Rome had been the capital of Europe that had given the German occupiers the most trouble (Kesslering and Kappler also expressed similar considerations).

However, despite the activism of the Roman Resistance and the advance of the Americans on Rome, the Liberation Committee did not proclaim a general insurrection in the capital. Sandro Pertini argued that the general insurrection did not take place because the Germans (notably Kesselring) let the Liberation Committee know, through the Vatican (by contacting the Pope or a cardinal), that they would leave Rome and that if the patriotic groups harassed them they would put the city to fire and sword. Historians have integrated this version of events with other considerations. According to Davide Conti "a peaceful exit of the German troops from Rome was agreed upon, with the important mediation of the Vatican and the consent of the moderate components of the Resistance. The left would have wanted an insurrection before the arrival of the Allies, but they did not have the strength. Unlike in the North, in fact, there were no partisan bands coming down 'from the mountains' or invading the Po Valley, as happened in Milan, Turin and Bologna". According to Anna Foa, "the diplomatic negotiations with the Germans, conducted by Pius XII during the occupation, aimed not only to save people but also to save the city, avoiding the battle for Rome. This was the focus of the meeting in May between the Pope and General Rainer Stahel." According to Alessandro Portelli, "the monarchist forces and the Church acted to prevent the insurrection, fearing that the communists and the left would take advantage of it and that it would cause damage and suffering to the city." For Gabriele Ranzato, the factors that contributed were "the Romans' lack of inclination to revolt; the opposition of the Allies, who wanted the transfer of power to General Roberto Bencivenga, as Badoglio's representative; the military strength of the Germans, still intact unlike in April 1945; and finally the intervention of the Vatican." According to Mariano Gabrieli, "the macroscopic error in forecasting the timing of liberation committed by the Allies following the landing at Anzio on 22 January 1944 had an impact. After the landing, the Allies ordered the clandestine military front of Montezemolo to rise up. Many soldiers exposed themselves and were arrested." Another partisan, Massimo Rendina (Note: Massimo Rendina (Venice, 4 January 1920 – Rome, 8 February 2015) was an Italian journalist and partisan), claimed that "the agreement was promoted by the Vatican, which guaranteed the Germans that they could leave the city without being attacked. In fact, armed clashes were very few. I believe that the CLN was in favour of not insurrection."

Even in the absence of a general uprising order, partisans attacked German units in the city and the province, aiming to capture men or equipment and prevent the destruction of local infrastructure during rearguard operations aimed at slowing the Allied pursuit. Clashes between Allied troops and Germans also occurred. As the Allies approached Rome, the German occupiers and fascist collaborators retreated along several roads, including the Cassia and the Flaminia. Along the Appian Way, Filippo Caruso 's Carabinieri of the FCMR fought against German units. Collaborating police commissioner Pietro Caruso was involved in a car accident and arrested by partisans. Fighting was also fierce for American soldiers at San Basilio, Tiburtino III, and Pietralata. In Garibaldi's VIIIth Zone, partisans made contact with Allied troops and captured 60 German soldiers, handing them over to the Allies. At Villa Certosa on the Casilina, the partisans fought against the Germans, and six of them lost their lives. During the liberation of the VIIIth Zone, partisan losses were sustained. Matteotti squads attacked the Germans, and a violent clash ensued at the Ostiense station.

Entry of Allied Troops Into Rome, 5 June 1944 in front of the Vittoria Emmanuel Memorial.

At 10 a.m. on June 5, partisans from the "Banda Roma" of Prima Porta, under the command of Captain Raffaele Ridolfi, fought against the Germans in a column composed of six trucks, three cars, and two tanks. One of the tanks was stopped by Felice Rosi, 19, who managed to plant two hand grenades in its tracks. He was then killed by a hail of bullets while attempting to stop the other tank. Fighting on the Via Salaria, thirteen-year-old Ugo Forno, known as "Ughetto," was killed. He and his companions had managed to prevent the Germans from blowing up the bridge over the Aniene. Francesco Guidi, hit in his side, died in the hospital. Sandro was left with an arm missing.

A young Roman student, during the celebrations for the liberation of the city of Rome, having learned that the Germans, beating a retreat, were about to blow up the railway bridge over the Aniene, with great initiative, mobilized himself, together with other young people, and with weapons prevented the German soldiers from completing their action. During the firefight, however, he was hit, tragically losing his life. A shining example of patriotic love and commendable courage. (5 June 1944 - Rome)

— Rome, 16 January 2013

In Monterotondo, partisans led by Alvaro Marchini and others fought against the Germans, capturing about 250 prisoners. On the night of June 5–6, the Germans bombed Monterotondo, causing numerous casualties. It was in this context that the Nazi SS killed Italian prisoners, including Bruno Buozzi and Edmondo Di Pillo. During the liberation of Rome, General Roberto Bencivenga, who had settled in the Campidoglio, assumed the military and civil command of Rome, while on 5 June Vittorio Emanuele III transferred his powers to his son Umberto of Savoy, appointing him Lieutenant General of the Kingdom.

== Aftermath ==
The liberation of the capital had effects on the Kingdom of the South, as the subordination to AMGOT, the Allied Military Administration of the Occupied Territories, had already ended in February 1944, as in almost all the rest of Italy under Allied control. King Vittorio Emanuele III appointed his son Umberto Lieutenant of the Kingdom and retired to private life. The Badoglio II Government resigned and Umberto, having taken up residence at the Quirinale, entrusted the task of forming the new government to Ivanoe Bonomi, an elderly political leader who had already been Prime Minister before the advent of fascism.

Operation Diadem ended with an Allied success and the liberation of Rome, which had an undoubted symbolic and political significance, but did not achieve decisive results from a strategic point of view; the Germans lost around 10,000 men and took 20,000 prisoners, but Alexander's forces also suffered heavy losses (18,000 Americans, 14,000 British, and 10,000 French), without managing to destroy Field Marshal Kesselring's two armies, which retreated in an orderly fashion north of Rome while remaining united. Furthermore, due to the fundamental strategic choices of the Allied political-military leadership, Alexander had to abandon his plans to exploit the victory with an ambitious march towards north-eastern Italy and Austria the American leaders opposed this plan and imposed the execution of the already planned Operation Anvil, which envisaged a landing in southern France with troops taken from Clark, by 15 August 1944. Generals Truscott and Juin left the Italian front and three American and four French divisions were withdrawn to prepare for the landing in Provence; Alexander also had to give up a good part of the tactical air support forces.

The British general was thus able to resume the advance north of Rome as early as 5 June 1944, but his forces were progressively weakened by the departure of the Franco-American divisions; furthermore, the Allied offensive was conducted with insufficient determination and gave the German High Command the opportunity to reorganise its forces with the influx of four new divisions from other fronts. Albert Kesselring once again managed to control the situation and avoid an irreversible defeat, leading with notable skill the hard-fought retreat of his troops through central Italy thanks to the high fighting spirit of his soldiers and some Allied errors in particular, in his memoirs the field marshal highlighted how the Anglo-Americans did not fully commit their air force, did not carry out landings to outflank his forces and did not coordinate the advance with the activities of the Italian partisans in the rear of the German front. Kesselring retreated in an orderly fashion first towards Lake Bolsena and then towards the new line of Lake Trasimeno, the so-called Albert Line; the field marshal managed to convince Hitler to give up an all-out resistance to avoid further losses and to continue an elastic defence to gain time.

=== Roosevelt's speech ===
The day after the liberation of Rome, US President Franklin D. Roosevelt gave a speech celebrating the success, emphasizing the symbolic value of entering the city that had dominated the known world during the Roman Empire and was home to the Catholic Church. He warned, however, that victory in the war, while certain, was still distant, and the conflict against Germany was still long and painful. Recalling the campaign that paved the way to Rome, Roosevelt thanked the Anglo-American military, the remaining Allied forces, and the Italian co-belligerent army, who had also taken part in battles (Montelungo and Monte Marrone). He announced plans to feed the capital, exhausted after the harsh German occupation, and expressed confidence in Italy's cooperation in the future. He also noted Italian emigration to North and South America and the contribution of Italians to civilization. It was a step appreciated by important politicians, such as Luigi Sturzo, and in general by Italian public opinion, especially by those who believed in the value of resistance and co-belligerence to "redeem the honour of Italy" after the alliance with Nazi Germany.

It is significant that Rome was liberated by the armed forces of many nations. American and British troops who bore the brunt of the battle found our North American neighbors, the valiant Canadians, at their side. New Zealand fighters from the far South Pacific, the brave French and Moroccans, South Africans, Poles, and Indians all fought with us on the bloody journey to the city of Rome. Even the Italians, having renounced an Axis alliance they never desired, sent their troops to join us in battle against the Germans who invaded their soil... The Italian people are capable of governing themselves. Let us not lose sight of their virtues as a peace-loving nation. Let us remember the many centuries in which Italians have been leaders in the arts and sciences, enriching the lives of all humanity. We remember the great sons of the Italian people Galileo and Marconi, Michelangelo and Dante and incidentally that courageous discoverer who represents the courage of Italy Christopher Columbus...We want and expect the help of the future Italy towards a lasting peace.

— Franklin D. Roosevelt, 5 June 1944

== In fiction ==
- Rome, Open City, 1945 film directed by Roberto Rossellini
- Anzio (film), 1968 film directed by Edward Dmytryk and Duilio Coletti
- Americans in Rome, 2004 documentary film directed by Pino Nazio

== See also ==
- Operation Fourth Term
- East African campaign (World War II)
- Historiography of World War II

== Reference ==
=== Sources ===
- Casavola, Anna Maria (2008). 7 ottobre 1943: La deportazione dei carabinieri romani nei lager nazisti. Rome: Edizioni Studium.
- Bauer, Eddy (1971). Storia controversa della seconda guerra mondiale. Vol. V. Novara: De Agostini.
- Katz, Robert (2003). Roma città aperta. Milan: Il Saggiatore. ISBN 978-88-565-0047-9.
- Liddell Hart, Basil H. (2009) [1970]. Storia militare della seconda guerra mondiale. Oscar Storia. Milan: Mondadori. ISBN 978-88-04-42151-1.
- Kesselring, Albert (2007). Soldato fino all'ultimo giorno. Gorizia: Libreria editrice goriziana. ISBN 978-88-6102-003-0.
- Morris, Eric (1983). La guerra inutile. Milan: Longanesi & C.
- Simonetti, Fabio (2016). Via Tasso: Quartier generale e carcere tedesco durante l'occupazione di Roma. Rome: Odradek. ISBN 978-88-96487-55-6.
- Ranzato, Gabriele (2000). "Roma". In Enzo Collotti, Renato Sandri e Frediano Sessi (ed.). Dizionario della Resistenza [Dictionary of Resistance] (in Italian). Vol. I. Torino: Einaudi. pp. 412–23.
- Cipriani, Felice (2009). Roma 1943-45: Racconti di guerra e lotta per la liberazione (in Italian). Rome: Associazione Walter Tobagi.
- Portelli, Alessandro (1999). L'ordine è già stato eseguito. Roma, le Fosse Ardeatine, la memoria [The order has already been carried out. Rome, the Fosse Ardeatine, the memory] (in Italian). Roma: Donzelli Editore. ISBN 978-88-7989-457-9.
