= Paul Hofmann =

Paul Hofmann (20 November 1912 in Vienna – 30 December 2008) was an Austrian, later American, author, journalist, linguist, and political activist. The New York Times, for whom he was a foreign correspondent, described him as fluent in German, Italian, French, and English, and having a command of several other languages that was more than passable, as well as "a broad grasp of history and diplomatic affairs and an often playful curiosity".

== Biography ==
Hofmann was born in Vienna, Austria on 20 November 1912. He was raised for the most part by his uncle, who was an influential Socialist. He studied law at the University of Vienna after which he became a member of the Christian Socialist Party.

In 1934 he became a travelling speaker for the Catholic Popular Federation, and after two years with the Federation, he became the chief editorial writer of one of their publications, Die Sonntagsglocke. In the late 1930s, as Austria came under increasing pressure to submit to a union with Germany, Hofmann wrote editorials urging his country to resist the Nazi initiative. In March 1938 as German troops occupied Vienna he fled to Rome, Italy, only hours before his apartment was raided by the Gestapo.

In Rome during German occupation, he was drafted into the German Army where he worked as the interpreter for the Nazi commanders, General Rainer Stahel and General Kurt Mälzer. After contacting members of the anti-Fascist Resistance in Rome he passed them information gleaned from his work, including information about the deportation of Jews and the Ardeatine massacre. Eventually deserting, Hoffman hid with his family in a convent, and later a safe apartment. In November 1944 he was convicted in absentia and sentenced to death for treason by a German military court in occupied northern Italy.

After Rome was captured by the Allies Hofmann briefly worked for the Allied Psychological Warfare Bureau as a broadcaster. After the war he served as a witness in the prosecution of General Mälzer for war crimes. Linking up with allied journalists in Rome soon after liberation Hofmann became a news assistant at The New York Times' bureau in Rome. He would continue to report for the Times until his retirement in 1990.

In Rome, he married Maria Anna Tratter and in 1940 they had a son, Ernesto. He also had a son with Christine Lord, Alexander Hofmann-Lord.

After his retirement from the Times, in 1990, he wrote more than a dozen books, including, The Seasons of Rome: A Journal, That Fine Italian Hand, Umbria: Italy's Timeless Heart (1999), The Viennese and O Vatican! A Slightly Wicked View of the Holy See.

He died in Rome on 30 December 2008.
