= Werl Prison =

Prison in Germany

Coordinates: 51°33′49″N 7°54′59″E

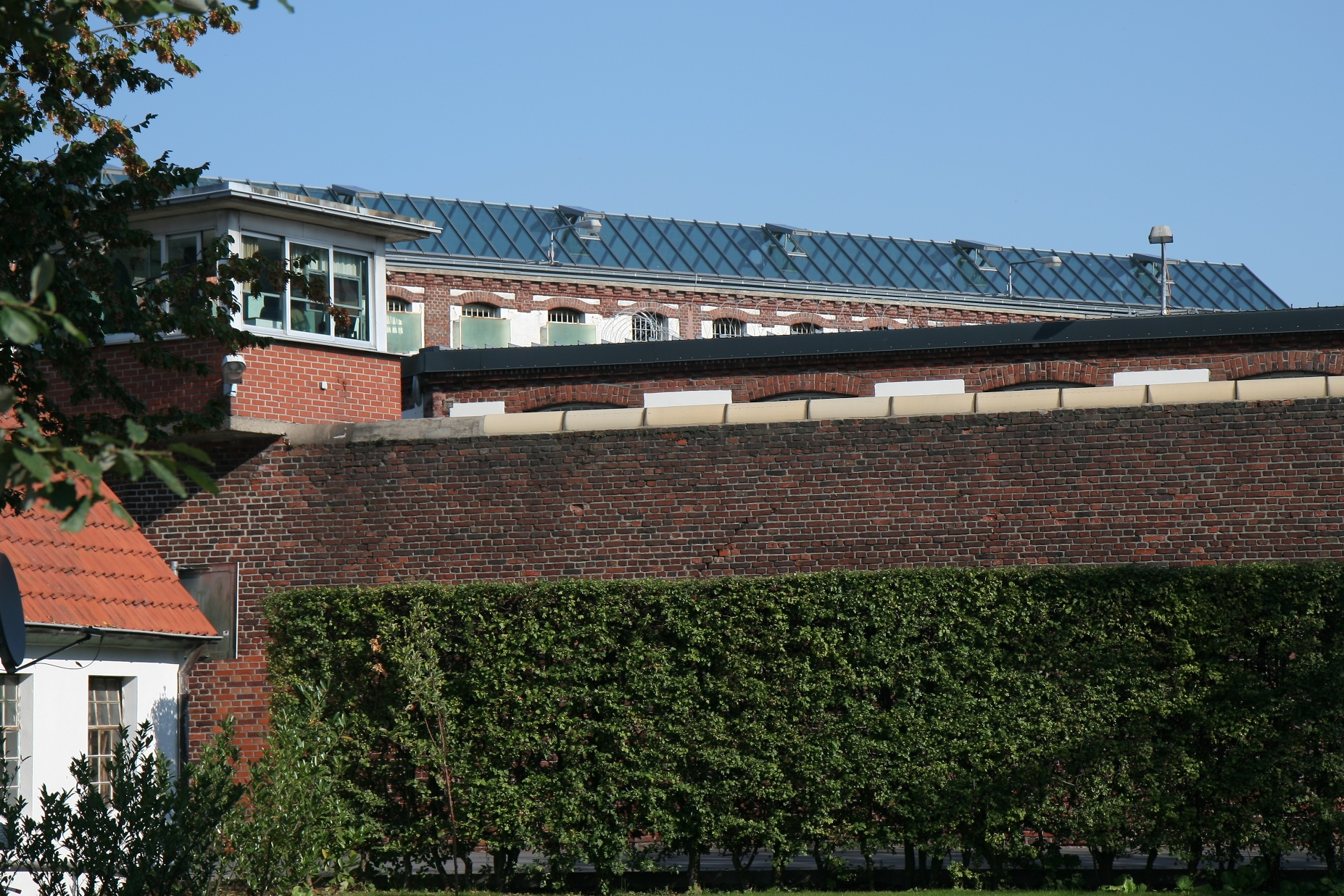
Werl Prison

Werl Prison has about 900 inmates, and is one of the largest prisons in Germany. It is located in the town of Werl in the state of North Rhine-Westphalia, east of Dortmund.

In April 1945, the 95th Infantry Division (United States) "Victory" division uncovered a German prison and civilian labor camp in the town of Werl. On April 7, the unit reported discovering a camp housing some 4,500 undernourished French officers and 800 enlisted men. The 95th provided the prisoners with emergency rations from the division's own supplies.

The 95th Infantry Division (United States) was recognized as a liberating unit by the United States Army Center of Military History and the United States Holocaust Memorial Museum in 1995.

After World War II, the British military used Werl Prison to house Nazi war criminals they had convicted during the occupation. They released their last two inmates on June 24, 1957. The prisoners were Hans Kühne, a former Luftwaffe pilot who was complicit in the murders of four Royal Canadian Air Force airmen, and Wilhelm Katerndahl, a local Nazi Party leader who was complicit in the murder of an RAF airman. The British military also carried out several executions by firing squad of Nazi war criminals at Werl Prison.

== Notable inmates ==
- Eduard Crasemann
- Nikolaus von Falkenhorst
- Curt Gallenkamp
- Albert Kesselring
- Eberhard von Mackensen
- Kurt Mälzer
- Erich von Manstein
- August Schmidt
- Max Simon
