= Celeste Di Porto =

Jewish-Italian Nazi collaborator

- Born: 29 July 1925; Rome, Kingdom of Italy
- Died: 13 March 1981 (aged 55); Rome, Italy
- Other names: Stella Martellini; Stella di Piazza Giudia; Pantera Nera
- Citizenship: Italian

Celeste Di Porto (Rome, 29 July 1925 – Rome, 13 March 1981) was an Italian-Jewish collaborationist during the Nazi occupation of Rome.

== Biography ==
Di Porto was born in 1925 in Rome's Jewish ghetto. She was described as a beautiful and ruthless girl. As a result of her humble origins she had to work as an adolescent, accepting work with other residents of the ghetto. She then became a waitress in the Il Fantino restaurant in Piazza Giudia, still inside the ghetto and known to be frequently visited by fascists (this is where she gained the nickname of Stella di Piazza Giudia or Star of Piazza Giudia). This is where she met fascist thug Vincenzo Antonelli, with whom she would begin a relationship, despite having been promised in marriage to another resident of the ghetto.

=== Collaboration with the Nazis ===
Following the armistice of September 8, 1943 and the occupation of Rome by German troops, the Jewish population began to be rounded up, with a reward of 5,000 lire (almost a year's wages) offered by the Gestapo for each Jew that was handed over. Di Porto's friendship with the fascists protected her, but also allowed her to become an informer. Following the 16th of October roundup of the ghetto, she collaborated with the capture of numerous Jews, gaining the nickname of pantera nera (black panther).

The most notable case was following the death of 33 German soldiers in the via Rasella attack, Di Porto revealed the location of 26 Jews who were executed as part of the reprisal at the Ardeatine massacre. Among those who were to be executed was also Di Porto's brother, Angelo, that she was able to save in exchange for another acquaintance, the Roman-Jewish boxer Lazzaro Anticoli, known as Bucefalo, who graffitied a message on the wall of his cell at the Regina Coeli prison blaming Di Porto for his death. Di Porto also protected her childhood friends and family, warning them about impending Nazi raids.

=== Post-war ===
Following the Allied liberation of Rome on June 4, 1944, like many other collaborationists, Di Porto escaped from Rome and moved to Naples where she was not known. She used the alias of Stella Martellini and to support herself she became a prostitute in a brothel. During this activity she encountered two Jews from the Roman ghetto who recognized her and Allied troops had to intervene to save her from being lynched. She was held in the barracks for a few days before being released. Di Porto then sought refuge for a year in a convent in Perugia.

During the war crimes trials in the early post-war period she was arrested and condemned to 12 years in prison. Her defence lawyer was Francesco Carnelutti. While in prison she became acquainted with Tamara Cerri, lover of Pietro Koch. She was released early a result of a post-war amnesty. While in prison she converted to Catholicism and claimed that she intended to take religious vows before giving up. She lived for a brief period in Trento, where she attempted to join the Focolare Movement. While in Trento she learned to be a taylor and met Aldo Forlani whom she would marry in Assisi. They moved back to Rome where she found work as a hat maker and got married. She had one daughter and died in 1981.

== In popular culture ==
The writer Giuseppe Pederiali published a novel in 1995 titled Stella di Piazza Giudìa based on the story of Celeste Di Porto.

A play based on her life titled Celeste written by Fabio Pisano was also created.
