= Karl Hass =

German SS officer & war criminal (1912–2004)

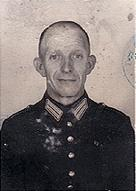
- Born: 5 October 1912; Kiel, German Empire
- Died: 21 April 2004 (aged 90); Castel Gandolfo, Italy
- Military career
- Allegiance: Nazi Germany
- Branch: Schutzstaffel
- Rank: Sturmbannführer

Karl Hass (5 October 1912 – 21 April 2004) was an SS Sturmbannführer and German spy who helped deport more than 1,000 Italian Jews to Auschwitz. A perpetrator in the Ardeatine massacre, in which 335 civilians were murdered, he was tried and convicted in Italy in 1998. Hass subsequently spent the remainder of his life under limited house arrest.

== Espionage ==
Hass was born in Kiel. In 1934, he joined the Sicherheitsdienst (SD), the SS's intelligence service, where his ruthlessness brought promotion. After the downfall of Benito Mussolini and the occupation of Italy by Nazi Germany, he was sent to Rome to set up a network of radio operators and to organize saboteurs behind the invading Allied lines. While in Rome, serving under SS-Obersturmbannführer Herbert Kappler, he aided in the deportation of more than 1,000 Jews to Auschwitz.

Hass had Princess Mafalda of Savoy, the daughter of King Vittorio Emanuele III of Italy, placed into German military custody, which eventually resulted in her death. He reputedly lured her to his headquarters in Rome by the suggestion that there was a message from her husband, who was then being held in Berlin. On her arrival at the German command, Hass had the princess arrested and sent for questioning to Munich. She was subsequently sent to Berlin and then to the Buchenwald concentration camp, where she was wounded in an Allied bombing raid. Despite receiving medical attention at the camp, she died following an operation to amputate her infected arm.

== Ardeatine massacre ==
Following a 23 March 1944 bomb attack in the Via Rasella by Italian resistance fighters that killed 33 soldiers, Hass, Capt. Erich Priebke and fellow officers rounded up 335 Italians and the next day transported them to the Ardeatine caves on the outskirts of Rome. Hass, Priebke and their soldiers systematically executed each captive with a shot to the back of the head. The Ardeatine massacre is one of the most notorious in the history of Italy during World War II.

== Post-war ==
After the war, Hass was taken prisoner by the Allies, but rather than being brought to justice for his war crimes, he was apparently employed by the United States Army Counter Intelligence Corps (CIC) to spy on the Soviet Union. In 1953, the CIC dispensed with his services, suspecting he was a double agent working for Cominform, the Soviet intelligence network. Only Kappler was charged with the Ardeatine cave massacre.

At some point in the 1960s, Hass returned to Italy. According to journalist Mario Tedeschini Lalli, Hass appeared as an extra in several Italian films, including Luchino Visconti's The Damned and Massacre in Rome - a film about the Ardeatine massacre. He may have also been employed by filmmakers as a technical advisor.

In 1994, Priebke, who had helped Hass with the executions, was interviewed in Argentina by an American television crew. As a result of the ensuing uproar in Italy, he was eventually extradited to stand trial. Hass returned to Italy from Switzerland to testify against Priebke, but decided against it and attempted to flee from his hotel room by climbing down from an outside balcony. He seriously injured himself after slipping and falling from the balcony and was taken to the hospital, where he ultimately gave testimony to court officials. In the court records, Hass admitted the execution of two civilians, but defended his actions by claiming he was only following orders, a defence which has been ruled invalid since the Nuremberg trials.

Tried and convicted for his role in the Ardeatine action, Hass was sentenced to life in prison in 1998. Considered to be in poor health, he was held under limited house arrest in a small town near Rome until his death in 2004.
