= Simone Simoni (general) =

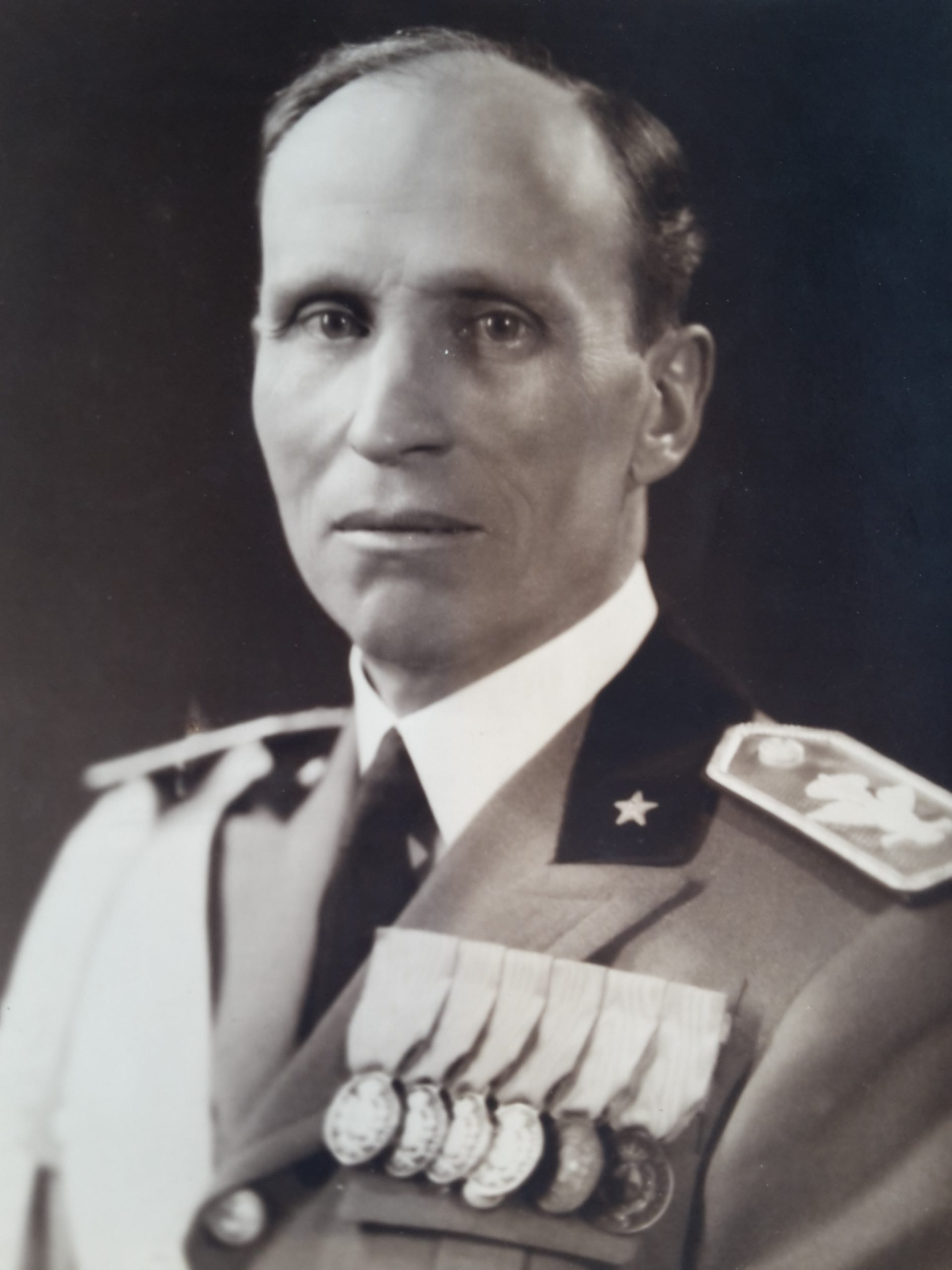
- Born: 24 December 1880; Patrica, Kingdom of Italy
- Died: 24 March 1944 (aged 63); Rome, Italian Social Republic
- Military career
- Allegiance: Kingdom of Italy
- Branch: Royal Italian Army
- Rank: Major General
- Conflicts: Italo-Turkish War; World War I; Battle of Caporetto; World War II
- Awards: Gold Medal of Military Valour (posthumous); Silver Medal of Military Valor (four times); Bronze Medal of Military Valor (twice)

Simone Simoni (24 December 1880 – 24 March 1944) was an Italian general and Resistance member during World War II.

== Biography ==
Simoni joined the Royal Italian Army in 1904. In 1908, with the rank of lieutenant, he participated in the rescue effort after the Messina earthquake, finding the remains of his fiancée under the rubble in Reggio Calabria. He later married and had four children. After participating in the conquest of Libya, he distinguished himself during the First World War, earning four silver and two bronze medals for military valour until he was seriously wounded and captured during the battle of Caporetto. Released after the end of the war, he was recognized as a war invalid for his injuries.

On February 24, 1923, with the rank of major, he participated in the foundation in Rome of the Blue Ribbon Institute (initially called the "Blue Legion"), gathering all recipients of awards for military valour in a nationalist perspective that saw the Great War as the fulfilment of the Italian Risorgimento. Simoni was thus one of the founding members of the Institute, along with Italo Balbo, Alessandro Pirzio Biroli, Cesare de Vecchi, Alfredo Guzzoni, Eugenio Casagrande and Giacomo Acerbo.

In 1932 he was transferred to the Army Reserve with the rank of major general. He then became president of a commercial company based in Rome, where he had moved with his family. His eldest son, Gastone Simone Simoni, who had followed his father's footsteps and pursued a military career (reaching the rank of captain in the 185th Infantry Division "Folgore"), was killed in action in October 1942 during the Second Battle of El Alamein, being posthumously awarded the Gold Medal of Military Valor.

After the announcement of the armistice of Cassibile on 8 September 1943, Simoni participated in the attempts to organize the resistance to the occupation of Rome by the German troops, and following the agreement that resulted in the ceasefire and German occupation of the capital, he joined the Clandestine Military Front, lending his own house and offices as clandestine headquarters of the Front. He was however reported by an informant and arrested at his home by SS soldiers on 23 January 1944, while returning from an important organizational meeting of the Front held in the aftermath of the Allied landing at Anzio.

He was then imprisoned in the SS prison in via Tasso, where he was repeatedly interrogated and tortured, as well as subjected to a mock execution, without ever revealing what the Germans wanted, namely the names of other resistance members and their hiding places. During his imprisonment, he managed to secretly send out of the prison a piece of paper with a short encrypted message, which, translated, read: "Simone Simoni - cell - twelve - Giuseppe - Ferrari - two. I am - beaten up - I suffer - with - pride - my – thought [goes] - to - my - fatherland - and - my - family". On 24 March 1944, he was executed with 334 other prisoners in the Fosse Ardeatine massacre. He was posthumously awarded the gold medal for military valour.
