= Ugo Forno =

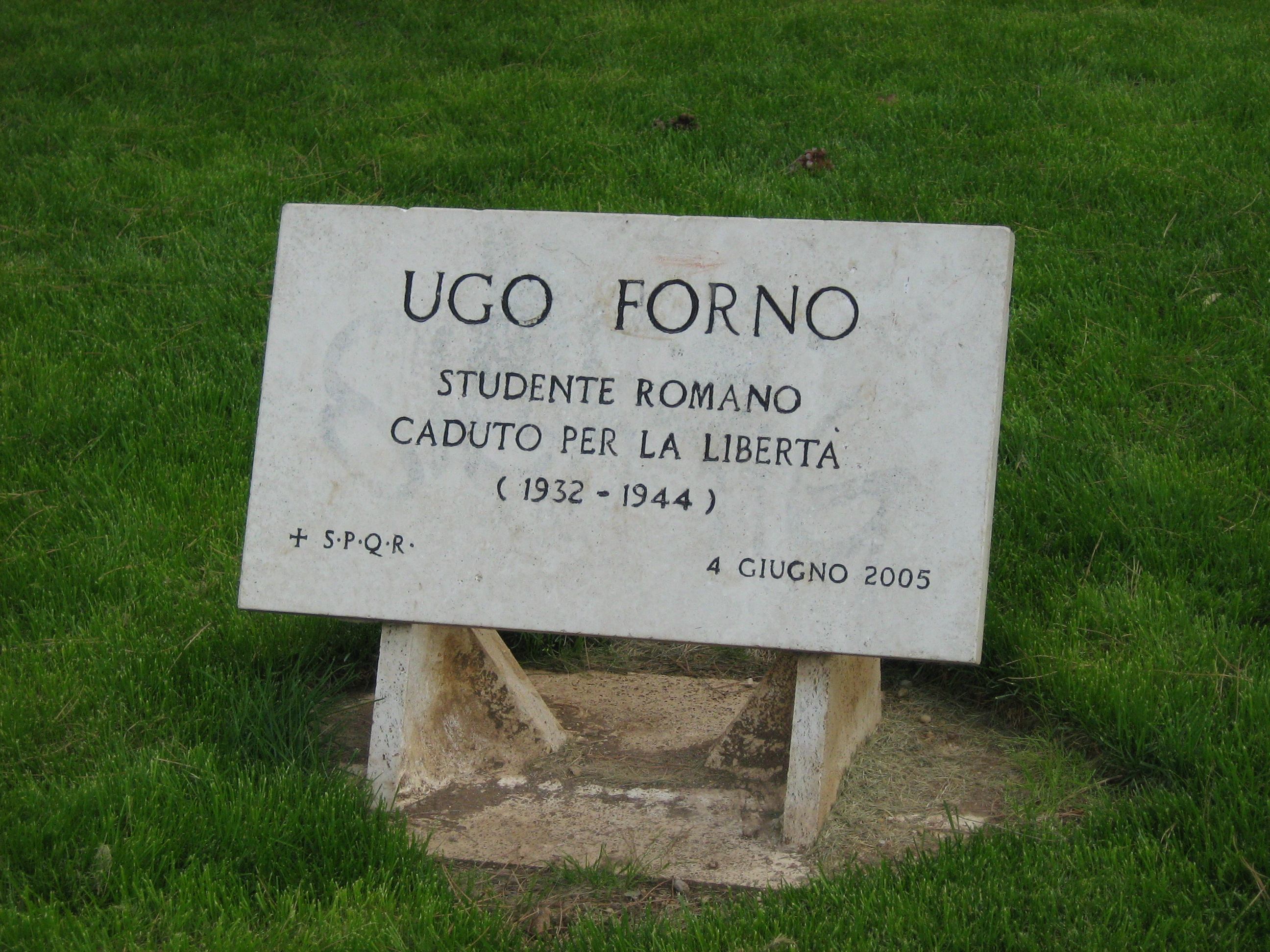
Plaque to Forno in Parco Virgiliano in Rome

Ugo Forno (Rome, 27 April 1932 – 5 June 1944) was an Italian student killed in Rome during World War II, while fighting against German invasion forces as a resistance fighter, during the defence of a railway bridge on the Aniene.

Known as "Ughetto," he was in second-grade at the time and died while German sappers attempted to destroy the bridge. The mission was successful, but mortar rounds killed Forno and other partisans.

The bridge is now named after him.

== Bibliography ==
- Brogi, Paolo (11 September 2001). "Ugo Forno, 12 anni, l'ultima vittima della guerra. Dimenticata". Corriere della Sera (in Italian).
- Brogi, Paolo (5 June 2010). "Il ponte sull'Aniene intitolato a Ugo Forno, eroe dodicenne del 1944". Corriere della Sera (in Italian).
- www.ugoforno.it (in Italian)
