= Ardeatine massacre =

1944 mass killing outside Rome by German soldiers

Coordinates: 41°51′24″N 12°30′37″E

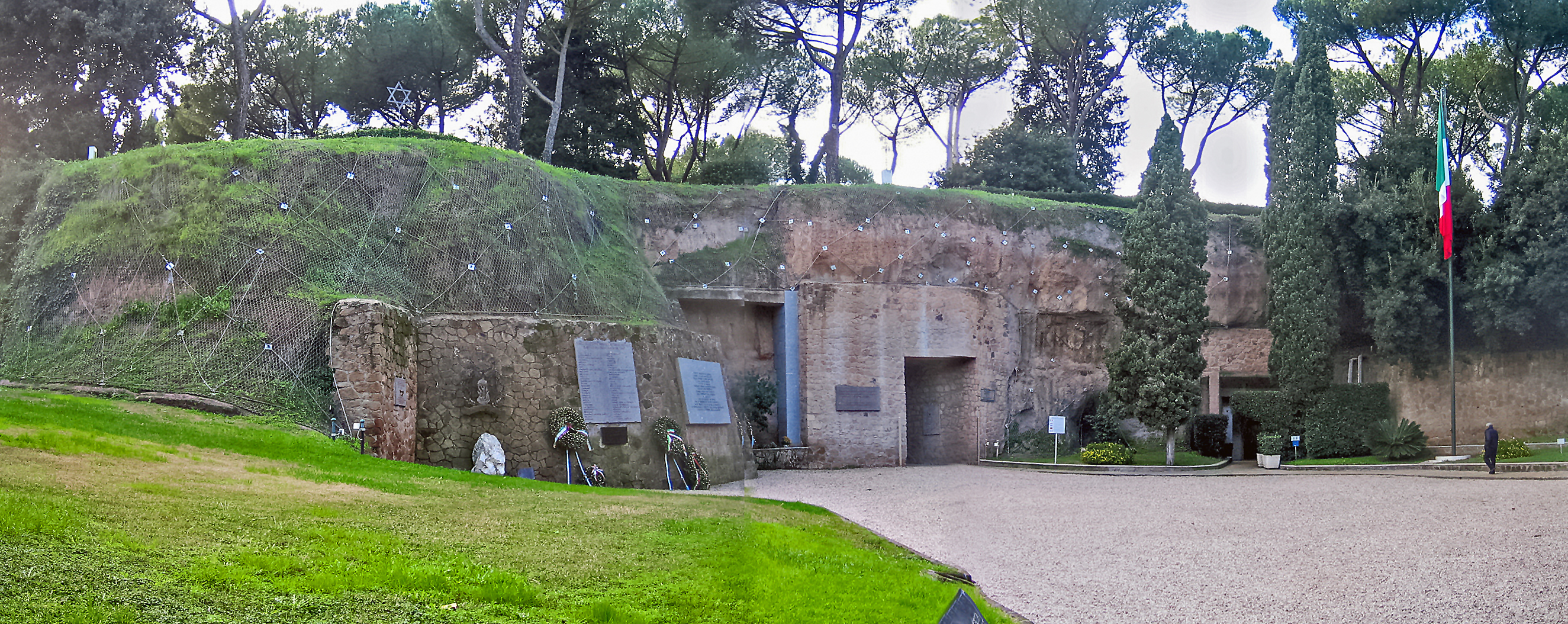
- Entry to caves in the Fosse Ardeatine Monument
- Location: Outside Rome, Italy
- Date: 24 March 1944
- Attack type: Mass murder, summary execution
- Deaths: 335
- Victims: Italian political prisoners and civilians
- Assailants: Albert Kesselring; Herbert Kappler; Erich Priebke; Karl Hass; Kurt Mälzer; Eberhard von Mackensen; Pietro Caruso; Unnamed SS; Unnamed SD; Unnamed Gestapo
- Motive: Reprisal for Via Rasella attack by Italian partisans

The Ardeatine massacre, or Fosse Ardeatine massacre (Italian: Eccidio delle Fosse Ardeatine), was a mass killing of 335 civilians and political prisoners carried out in Rome on 24 March 1944 by German occupation troops during the Second World War as a reprisal for the Via Rasella attack in central Rome against the SS Police Regiment Bozen the previous day.

Subsequently, the Ardeatine Caves site (Fosse Ardeatine) was declared a Memorial Cemetery and National Monument open daily to visitors. Every year, on the anniversary of the slaughter and in the presence of the senior officials of the Italian Republic, a solemn state commemoration is held at the monument in honour of the fallen. Each year, 335 names are called out, a simple roll call of the dead.

== Historical background ==
In July 1943, the Allies landed on the island of Sicily, preparing to invade the mainland, and Rome was bombed for the first time. On 24 July 1943, the Fascist Grand Council, which the dictator Benito Mussolini had not convened since 1939, met and overwhelmingly voted no confidence in Mussolini. The following day, anxious to extricate his country from an unsustainable war, King Victor Emanuel III, the titular head of the Italian state and Commander-in-Chief of the armed forces under Mussolini, appointed Marshal Pietro Badoglio to head a new military government. He then ordered his gendarmerie, the Carabinieri, to arrest and imprison Mussolini.

On 13 August 1943, Rome was bombed again, and the Badoglio government began secret surrender negotiations with the Allies in Sicily, although still outwardly allied to Nazi Germany. In accordance with the Pope's wishes, Badoglio also unilaterally declared Rome an open city, i.e., a demilitarized zone, a declaration the Allies would refuse to recognise and the Germans to respect. The Germans, anticipating an Italian defection, meanwhile began moving more and more troops into Italy (Operation Achse). Foreseeing a German invasion, a coalition of Anti-Fascist parties and Monarchists formed the Committee of National Liberation (CLN). On 3 September 1943, the Badoglio government signed an unconditional surrender, which U.S. General Eisenhower made public on the eve of the Fifth Army's amphibious landing at Salerno (8 September). At the same time, Badoglio issued the Badoglio Proclamation, directing Italian troops to end hostilities against the Allies but to oppose attacks "from any other quarter".

The following day, the German army began moving in on Rome, and that night the King and Badoglio fled the city for Pescara, whence by sea to Bari, leaving a leadership vacuum. The Royal Italian Army, although outnumbering the German soldiers three to one, was leaderless, poorly equipped, and in chaos. After a failed resistance in the working-class neighbourhood at the Porta San Paolo and the Pyramid of Cestius by remaining loyalist soldiers, carabinieri (including a school of cadets) and civilians, the Germans occupied Rome. They announced the imposition of German military law with summary execution for violators.

Three days later (on 12 September), Nazi commandos led by Waffen-SS officer Otto Skorzeny, tracked down and rescued Mussolini from his hidden prison in the Gran Sasso and set him up in the puppet regime of the so-called "Republic of Salò" in Northern Italy. In October 1943 the Nazis rounded up and deported the Jews of Rome for extermination at Auschwitz and also made numerous mass roundups of non-Jewish male civilians for forced labour. Meanwhile, General Mark Clark's Fifth Army in Salerno suffered severe setbacks, and General Eisenhower and other Allied leaders began concentrating their attention on the imminent invasion of France, temporarily neglecting Italy.

In December, the armed Partisan Resistance began to strike German forces in Rome. The Germans responded with raids carried out by mixed Gestapo and Italian Fascist police militias on Vatican institutions, known to be harbouring prominent CLN members and other Anti-Fascists. In January 1944, news of the surprise Allied landing behind enemy lines at Anzio (Operation Shingle), only 30 miles from Rome, created temporary euphoria among the Roman populace along with a dangerous relaxation of caution on the part of Resistance members, that enabled the Nazis to arrest and torture many of its most important leaders. In the meantime, General Clark's attempt to link up the Fifth Army with the Anzio troops was unsuccessful, as the Anzio forces were held back by a line of German fortifications hastily constructed using forced civilian labour.

== Partisan attack in Via Rasella ==
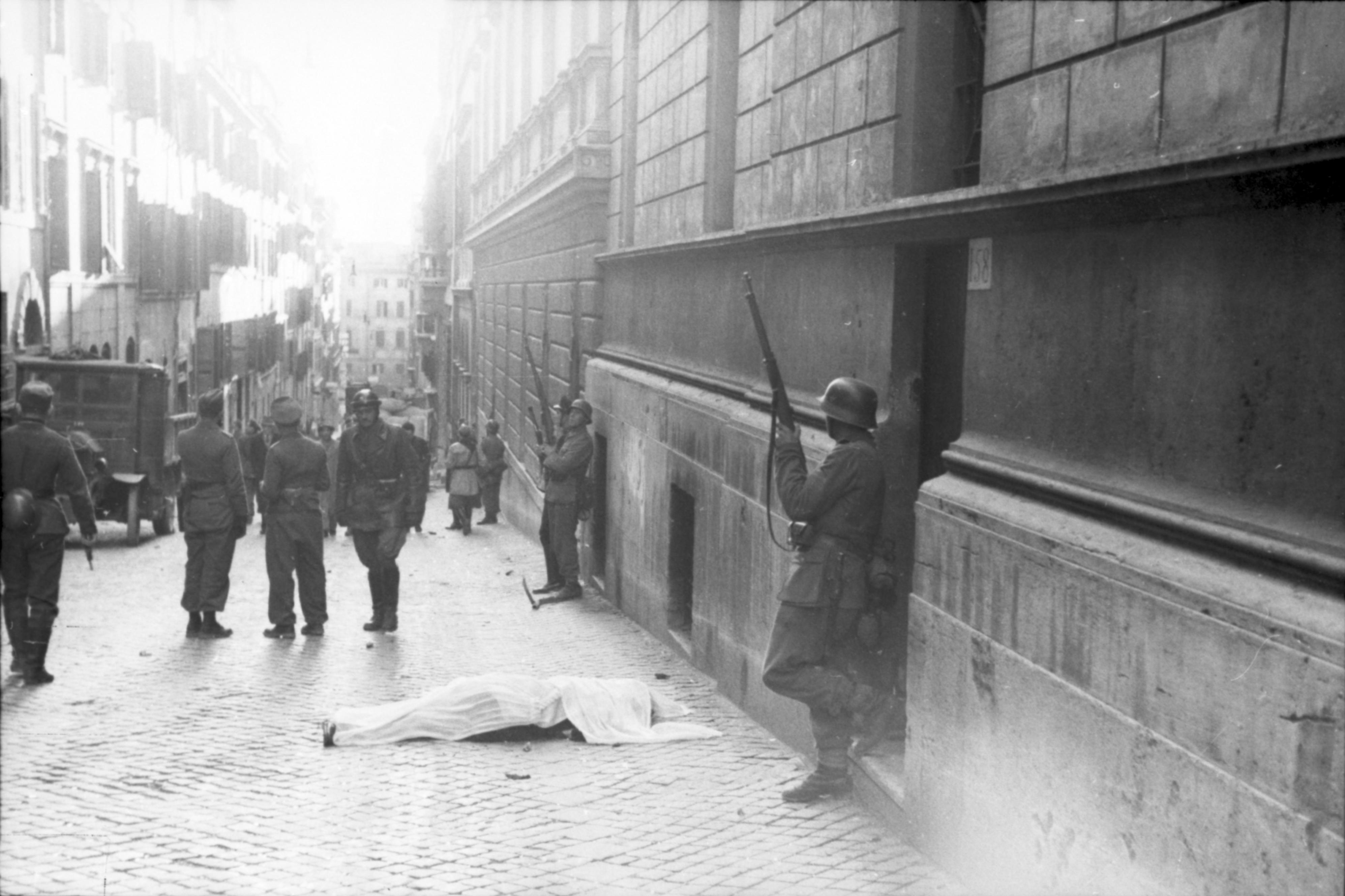
A body lies in the Via Rasella during the roundup of civilians by Italian soldiers and German troops after the partisan bombing on 23 March 1944

On 23 March 1944, a column of the German 11th Company, 3rd Battalion, Police Regiment "South Tyrol" was attacked by an ambush of Partisans, while marching and singing on a prescribed route that led through the Piazza di Spagna into the narrow street of Via Rasella. Organised by the Nazis to intimidate and suppress the Resistance, the battalion had been raised in October 1943 from ethnic German speakers of the northern Italian province of South Tyrol, a territory that Adolf Hitler had annexed to the German Reich after the September "betrayal" by the Italian government. Many of its citizens had since opted for German citizenship. The soldiers of the battalion were veterans of the Royal Italian Army who had seen action on the Eastern Front and had chosen service in the SS rather than face another tour in the East with the Wehrmacht.

The attack was carried out by 12 partisans of the Communist-dominated resistance organisation Gruppo d'Azione Patriottica ("Patriotic Action Group") or GAP. An improvised explosive device was prepared consisting of 12 kilograms of TNT packed in a steel case. This was inserted into a bag containing an additional six kilograms of TNT and TNT-filled iron tubing. Although reported as having been thrown from a building, the bomb had actually been hidden in a rubbish cart, pushed into position by a Partisan disguised as a street cleaner, while others acted as lookouts. The fuse was lit when the police were forty seconds from the bomb. The blast caused the immediate deaths of 28 German SS policemen and may have killed two civilian bystanders, one of whom, Piero Zuccheretti, was an eleven-year-old boy, although he might well have been killed by the Germans firing in response; it is unknown.

More would die over the next few days. All twelve Partisans, some of whom fired on the German column, succeeded in melting away into the crowd unscathed.

== Preparations for the reprisal ==
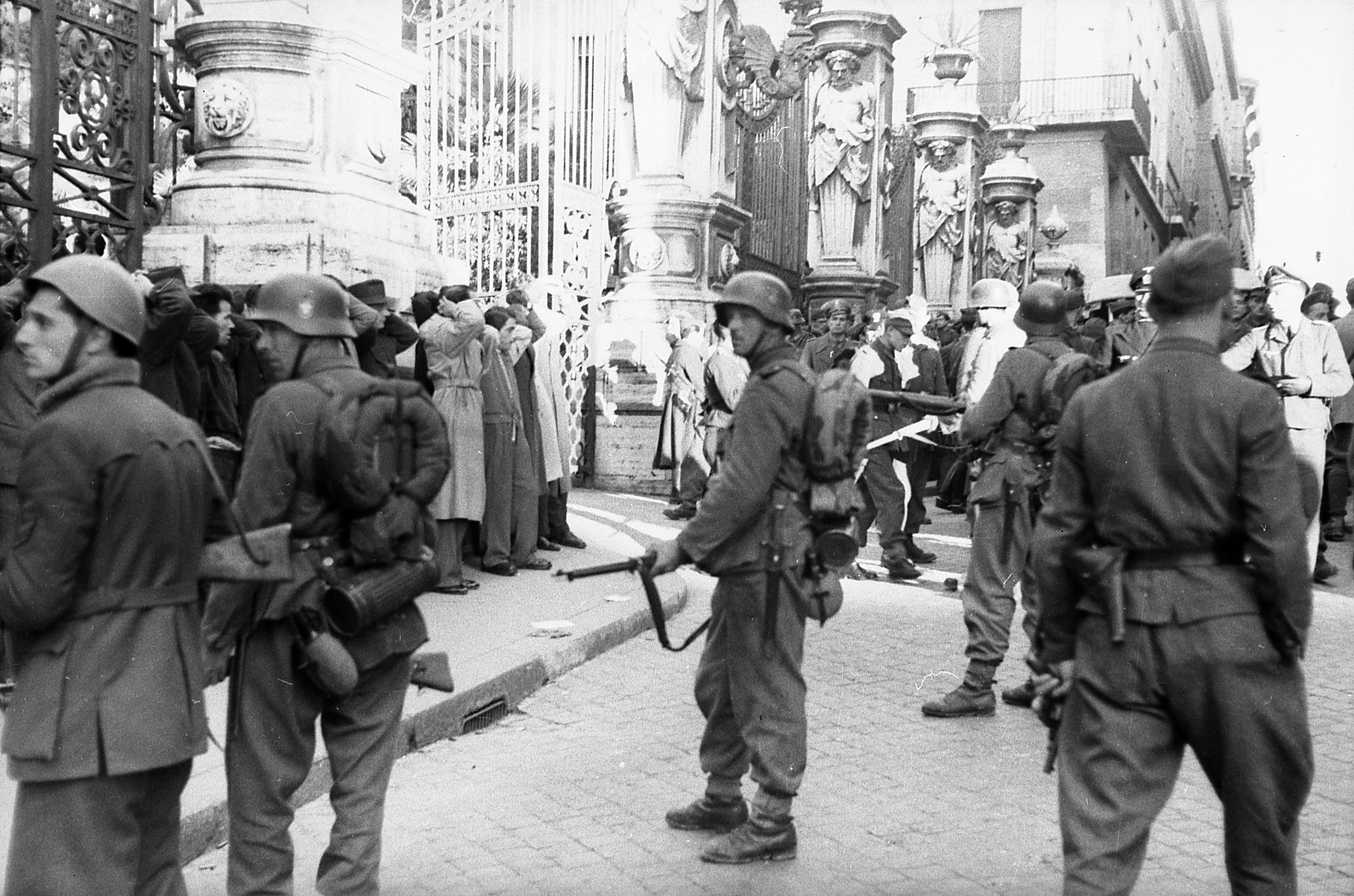
German troops and Italian soldiers of the Decima Flottiglia MAS round up civilians in front of the Palazzo Barberini, Rome, in March 1944

The German police attaché and commander of the Security Police in Rome, SS Obersturmbannführer Herbert Kappler was on the scene soon afterwards to supervise the investigation. That evening he was summoned to the headquarters of the German Armed Forces Commandant in Rome, Luftwaffe Generalmajor Kurt Mälzer, who had decided that the killings called for reprisals.

They agreed that the execution of ten Italians for each German policeman killed was a suitable ratio. Mälzer, who also proposed burning down part of Rome, passed this on to General Eberhard von Mackensen, the commander of the Fourteenth Army, whose jurisdiction included Rome. General Mackensen endorsed the recommendation. In turn, the staff of the German Commander-in-Chief South (Oberbefehlshaber Süd), passed this on to the Oberkommando der Wehrmacht (OKW). That night, Adolf Hitler authorised the reprisal, stipulating that it be carried out within 24 hours. Commander-in-Chief South Generalfeldmarschall Albert Kesselring, considered this an order, one he interpreted as calling for the execution of Italians who had been previously sentenced to death. He was assured by Kappler that sufficient prisoners were available.

However, Kappler had only four prisoners sentenced to death in his Hausgefängnis (private prison) at SS headquarters in the German Embassy on 145 Via Tasso (now the Museum of the Liberation of Rome); plus 17 serving long sentences; 167 deemed "worthy of death"; and two to four civilians who had been rounded up in the Via Rasella area on suspicion of involvement. Kappler's superior, SS Brigadeführer und Generalmajor der Polizei Wilhelm Harster, suggested making up the numbers from the 57 Jews also in Nazi custody. By noon on 24 March, Kappler had a list of 271 victims, each with his crime listed against his name, except for the Jews, who were simply listed as "Jew". By this time the death toll from the Via Rasella bombing had risen to 32. (One more would die while the reprisal was underway; the death toll eventually reaching 33.) To make up the numbers, Questore Pietro Caruso, chief of the Fascist police in Rome, offered some Italians from his Regina Coeli prison, among them Maurizio Giglio, who had been one of his own lieutenants, before being unmasked as a double agent working for the American OSS in charge of radio communications with the Fifth Army. Because of the time limit that Hitler had imposed, Mälzer and Kappler agreed that the victims would have to be shot in the back of the head at close range rather than by conventional firing squad. The men of the regiment Bozen, the unit which was hit in the attack, were offered the chance to avenge their comrades, but they refused to do it in that way. 26 of the victims shot in the caves were Jews betrayed by Celeste Di Porto, the terror of the Roman Ghetto.

== Massacre ==
The massacre was perpetrated without prior public notice in a little-frequented rural suburb of the city, inside the tunnels of the disused quarries of pozzolana, near the Via Ardeatina. By mistake, a total of 335 Italian prisoners were taken, five in excess of the 330 called for. On 24 March, led by SS officers Erich Priebke and Karl Hass, they were transported to the Ardeatine caves in truckloads and then, in groups of five, put to death inside the caves. Because the killing squad mostly consisted of officers who had never killed before, Kappler had ordered several cases of cognac delivered to the caves to calm the officers' nerves. The officers were ordered to lead the doomed prisoners into the caves with their hands tied behind their backs and then have them kneel down so that the soldiers could fire a bullet directly into the cerebellum, ensuring that no more than one bullet would be needed per prisoner. Many were forced to kneel down over the bodies of those who had been killed before them because the cave had become filled with dead bodies. During the killings, the existence of the five extra prisoners was discovered, and it was decided to kill them anyway, in order to prevent the place of execution from becoming known.

The bodies of the victims were placed in piles, typically about a metre in height, and then buried under tons of rock debris when German military engineers set explosives to seal the caves and hide the atrocity. They remained summarily buried and abandoned for over a year inside the caves. Families of the victims were notified with excruciating slowness by an individual letter, if at all, a strategy of cover-up and concealment—"Night and Fog"—designed to confuse, grieve, and intimidate surviving relatives, according to Robert Katz.

== Victims ==
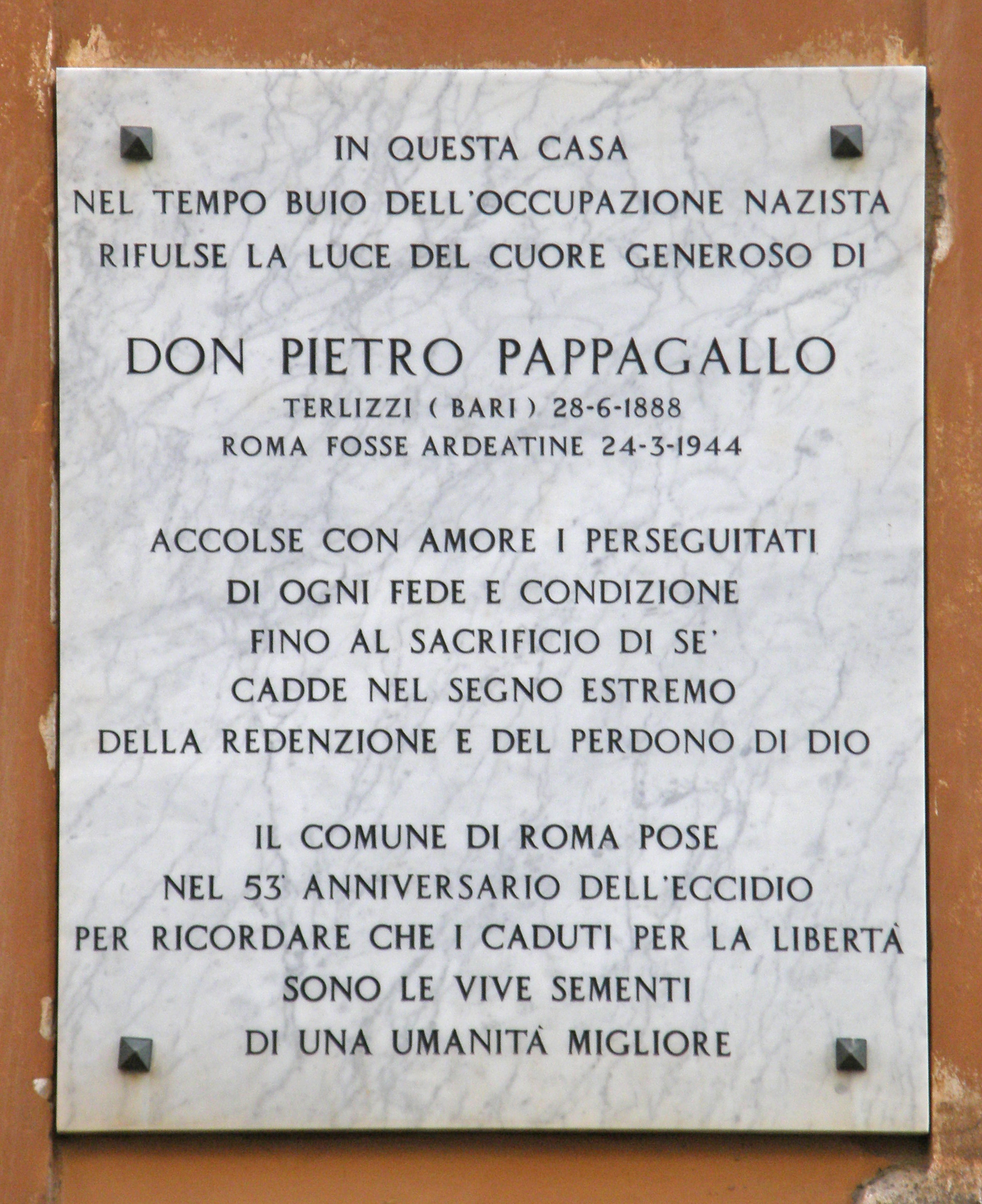
Plaque dedicated to Don Pietro Pappagallo, on the house in which he lived on the Via Urbana, Rome: IN THIS HOUSE IN THE DARK TIME OF THE NAZI OCCUPATION THERE SHONE THE LIGHT OF THE GENEROUS HEART OF DON PIETRO PAPPAGALLO TERLIZZI (BARI) 28·6·1888 ROME ARDEATINE CAVES 24·3·1944 HE RECEIVED WITH LOVE THE PERSECUTED OF EVERY FAITH AND CONDITION UNTO THE SACRIFICE OF HIS OWN SELF HE FELL IN THE ULTIMATE SIGN OF REDEMPTION AND THE FORGIVENESS OF GOD THE CITY OF ROME ON THE 53RD ANNIVERSARY OF THE MASSACRE REMEMBERS THAT THOSE WHO DIED FOR FREEDOM ARE THE LIVING SEEDS OF A BETTER HUMANITY

Misconceptions about the Fosse Ardeatine Massacre abound. Foremost among these is the notion that the Partisans responsible for the Via Rasella attack were ordered to come forward and turn themselves over to the SS and wilfully declined to do so.

Although it is sometimes claimed that the reprisal victims were predominantly Jewish, only 75 of the 335 victims selected for death in the caves were Jewish, this having been a criterion for selection (because Jews were known to be marked for death anyway). In fact, the victims comprised, in Robert Katz's words, "rich, and poor, doctors and lawyers, workers and shopkeepers, artists and artisans, teachers and students, men and teenage boys from every walk of life, and even a man of God ... among them". The main concern of the SS had been the speedy fulfilment of the quota. Some were residents of Via Rasella who were home at the time of the Partisan attack; others had been arrested and tortured for suspected Resistance and other anti-Fascist activities, while still others had been casually picked up on the streets or arrested at their homes on the basis of tips from Fascist informants. The youngest of them was 15 years old.

Political prisoners included members of the GAP, the PA, and the Monarchist Clandestine Military Front of the Resistance (FMRC), which included many policemen, among them Pietro Ermelindo Lungaro, later posthumously awarded the Silver Medal of Military Valor. Members of the Bandiera Rossa ("Red Flag") a dissident Communist Resistance group, constituted the largest group. One political prisoner, Padre Pietro Pappagallo, was one of the models for the character of Padre Pietro in Roberto Rossellini's pioneering neo-realist film Rome, Open City, filmed in 1944. Another, perhaps the most celebrated, was the aristocratic Colonel Giuseppe Montezemolo (age 44), who, after the flight of the King and Badoglio, had elected to stay and go underground in Rome, disguised in mufti as a professor or Ingegnere (engineer), to organize and lead the FMRC, representing the Badoglio Government, with which he had been in continual radio contact up until his arrest on 25 January 1944.

Colonel Giuseppe Montezemolo's incredible courage under torture which included having his nails and teeth pulled out, became legendary. Another was General Simone Simoni, a war hero aged 64, who had endured torture with a blowtorch. The old soldier had replied to his captors, "My only regret is that I was not younger because there was so much more I could have done [for my country]". Neither man ever talked or in any way betrayed their network.

Besides Simoni, four more generals were among the executed, all members of the Clandestine Military Front: Vito Artale, Dardano Fenulli, Roberto Lordi, and Sabato Martelli Castaldi.

== Perpetrators ==
- Adolf Hitler, committed suicide in Berlin, 1945.
- Albert Kesselring, tried 1947; released 1952; died 16 July 1960
- Eberhard von Mackensen, tried 1947; released 1952; died 19 May 1969
- Kurt Mälzer, sentenced to death; sentence commuted and died in prison 24 March 1952
- Wilhelm Harster, tried 1949; released 1953; tried 1967; pardoned 1969; died 25 December 1991
- Karl Hass, convicted 1998; under house arrest; died 21 April 2004
- Herbert Kappler, sentenced to life in prison (1947); escaped August 1977; died 9 February 1978
- Erich Priebke, 1996 tried found not guilty for "acting under orders"; 1998 condemned to life imprisonment; died while under house arrest 11 October 2013
- Pietro Caruso, executed 22 September 1944
- Carl-Theodor Schütz, died in Cologne 26 March 1985
- Celeste Di Porto (Rome, 29 July 1925 – Rome, 13 March 1981), known as the Terror of the Roman Ghetto, was a collaborator during the Nazi occupation of Rome, despite being Jewish herself; among those she denounced to the Germans was Roman Jewish boxer Lazzaro Anticoli, known as Bucefalo, who was killed during the Fosse Ardeatine massacre; postwar she served 7 years of a 12 year sentence for collaboration.

== The monument ==
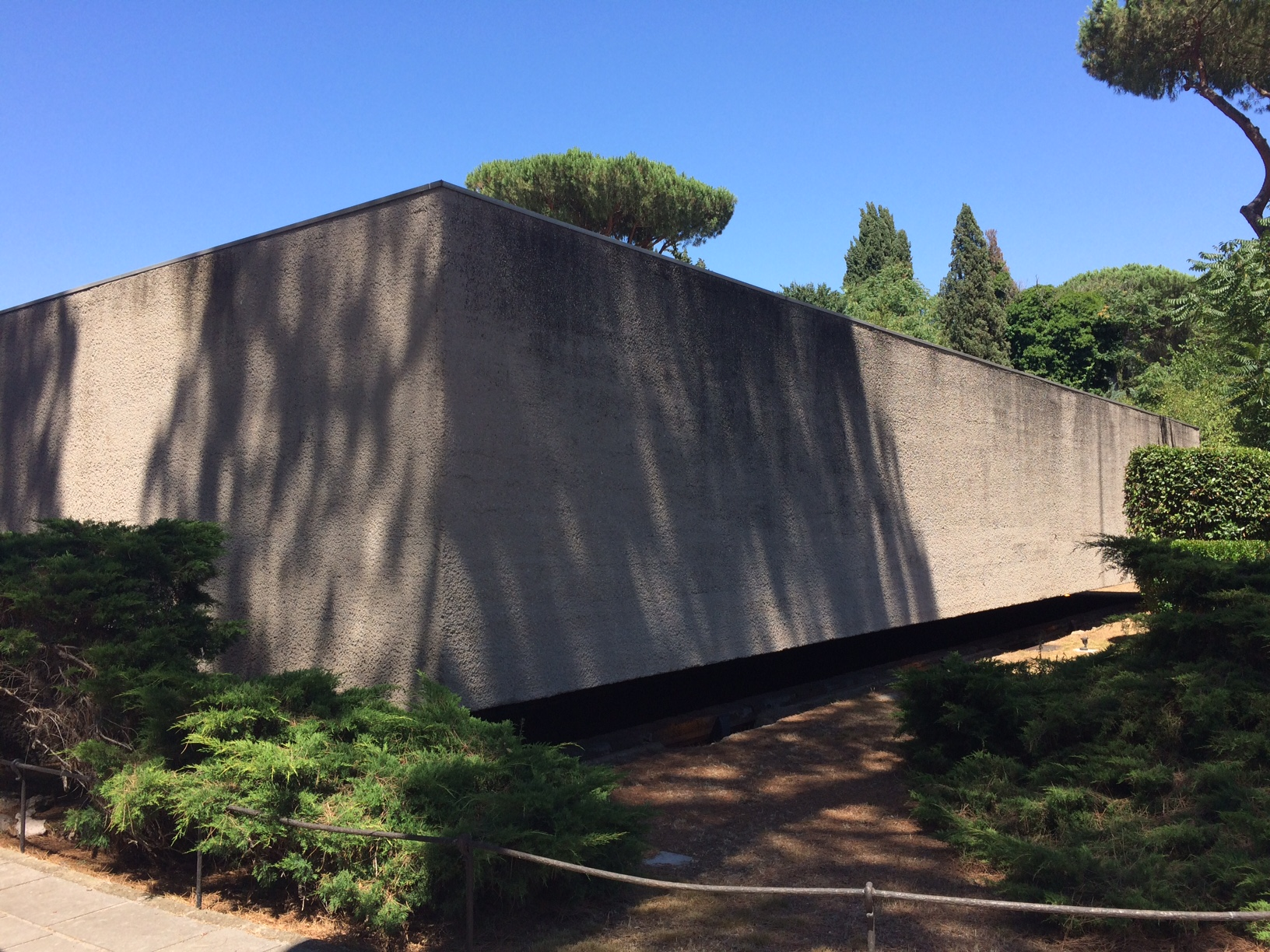
Mausoleo della Fosse Ardeatine

The design of the Fosse Ardeatine monument resulted from a national competition and was a collaboration between five architects (Nello Aprile, Cino Calcaprina, Aldo Cardelli, Mario Fiorentino & Giuseppe Perugini) and two sculptors (Francesco Coccia & Mirko Basaldella). The massive bronze gate by Mirko Basaldella used the ubiquitous barbed wire of battlefields and concentration camps as inspiration, merging it with the moving curlicues of a Tree of Life. The curved lines morph into a tangle of limbs reaching out across each other at those awkwardly bent angles characteristic of corpses. Also at the entrance is a colossal concrete statue by Francesco Coccia of three male figures standing together as one. Hands tied behind their backs, the three ages of man are bound together by ideals and fate—the youngest Fosse victim was 15, the oldest 70.

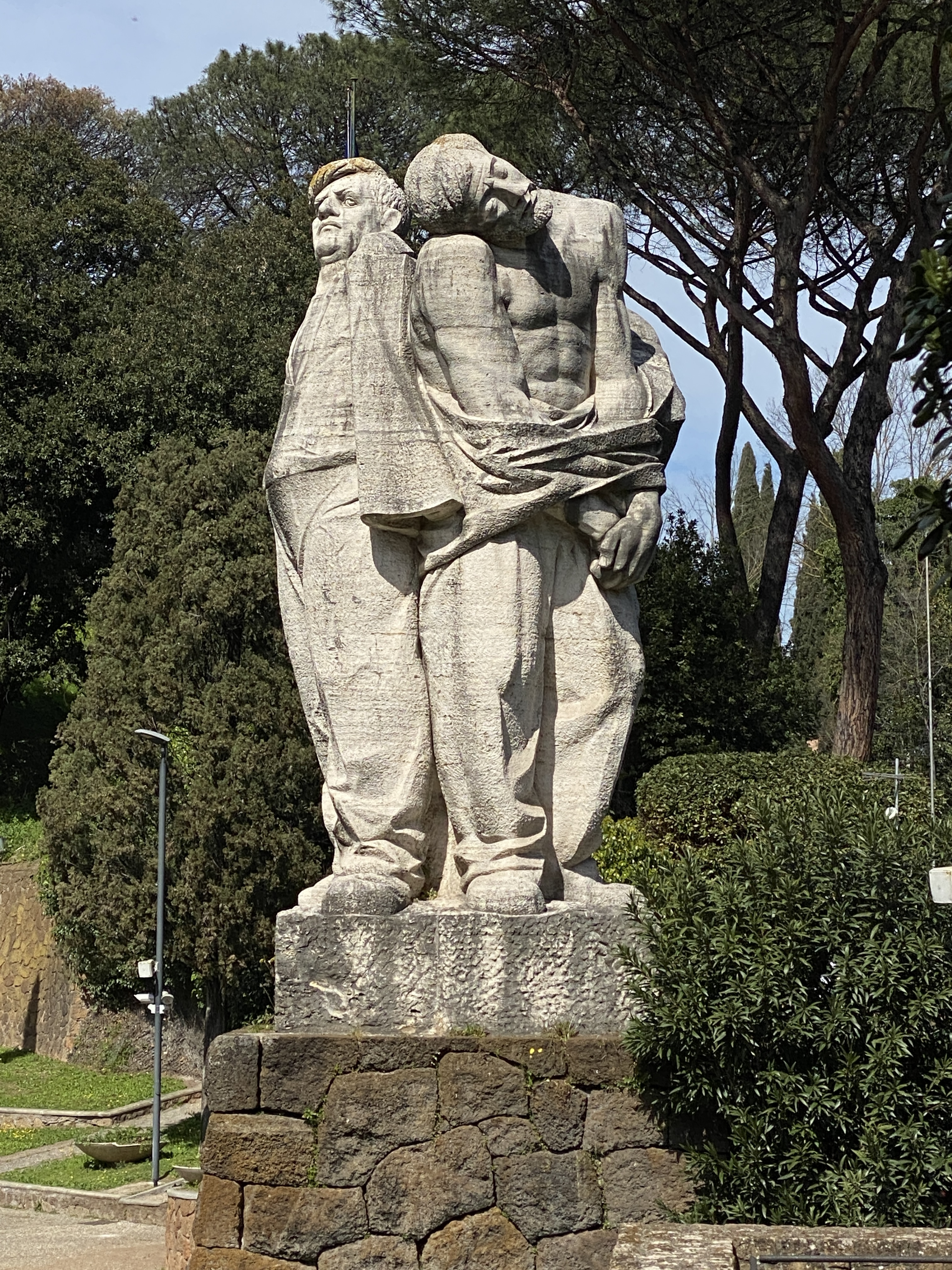
"The Three Ages of Man" by Francesco Coccia

Each face has a distinct expression portraying the range of emotions the men likely felt marching to their deaths in the quarry: despair, eyes half-closed in resignation, a resolute distant stare. Each face on the statue directs its gaze towards an important element of the memorial complex: the burial slab, the old quarries, and the forecourt. The memorial plaque outside the entry to the caves reads:

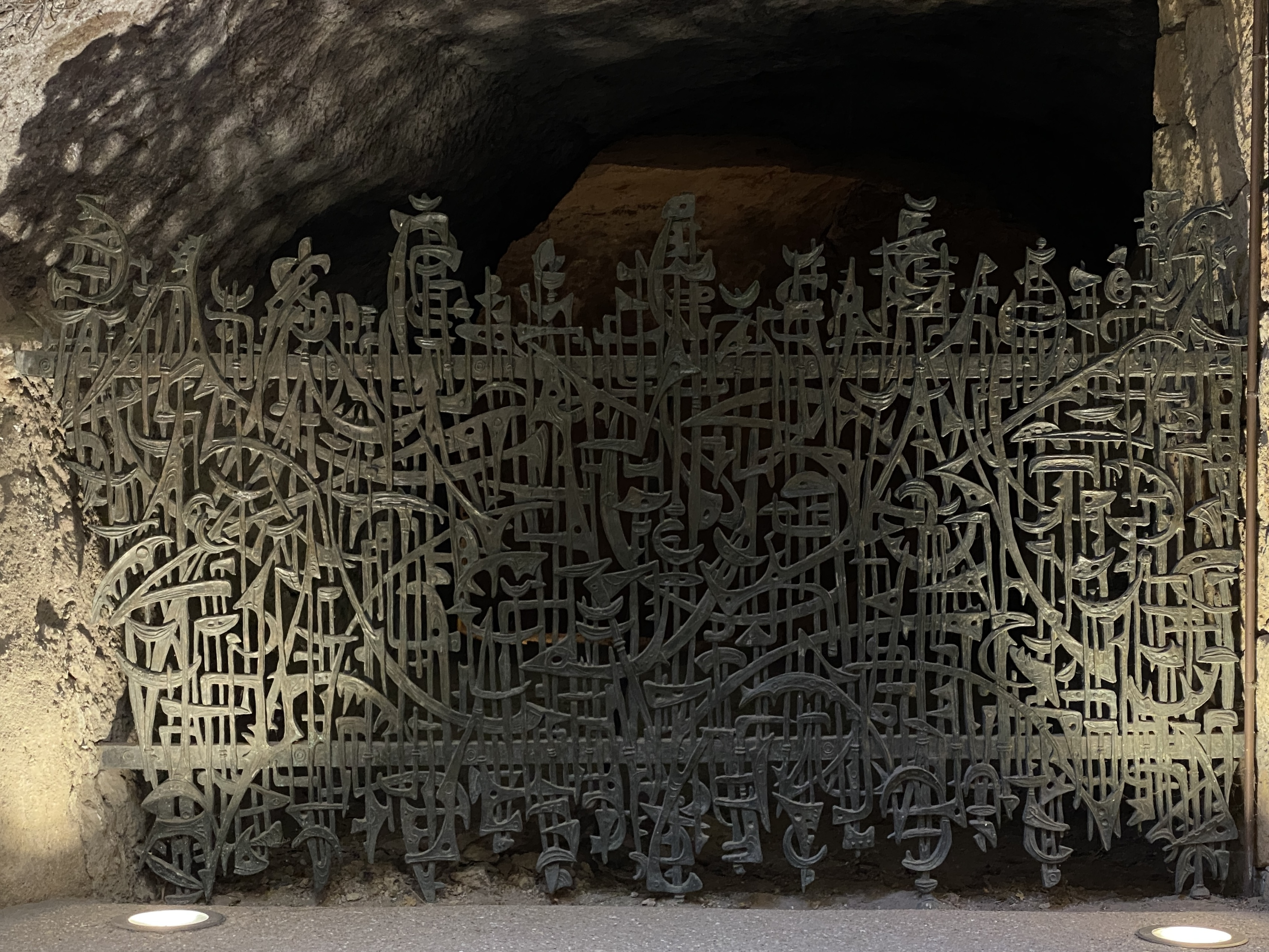
Interior gate at the Mausoleo della Fosse Ardeatine by Mirko Basaldella.

"WAYFARERS THIRSTY FOR LIBERTY – WE WERE ROUNDED UP AT RANDOM – IN THE STREET AND IN JAIL – AS A REPRISAL CAST IN EN MASSE – SLAUGHTERED AND WALLED WITHIN THESE PITS – ITALIANS, DO NOT CURSE – MOTHERS, BRIDES, DO NOT WEEP – CHILDREN, CARRY WITH PRIDE – THE MEMORY – OF THE HOLOCAUST OF YOUR FATHERS – IF OUR SLAUGHTER – WILL HAVE HAD A PURPOSE BEYOND REVENGE – IT IS TO ENSHRINE THE RIGHT OF HUMAN EXISTENCE – AGAINST THE CRIME OF MURDER."

Inside the former quarries themselves, there are two more plaques. One in the tunnel:

"WE WERE SLAUGHTERED IN THIS PLACE BECAUSE – WE FOUGHT AGAINST INTERNAL TYRANNY – FOR FREEDOM AND AGAINST THE FOREIGNER – FOR THE INDEPENDENCE OF THE HOMELAND – WE DREAMT A FREE, JUST – AND DEMOCRATIC ITALY. MAY OUR SACRIFICE AND OUR BLOOD – SOW THE SEED AND ACT AS WARNING FOR – GENERATIONS TO COME."

And another in the 'cave' at the very end where the massacre actually took place:

"HERE WE WERE SLAUGHTERED – VICTIMS OF A HORRENDOUS SACRIFICE – MAY OUR SACRIFICE GIVE RISE TO A BETTER HOMELAND – AND TO LASTING PEACE AMONG THE PEOPLES. FROM THE DEPTHS, I HAVE CRIED OUT TO YOU, O LORD."

The last phrase, taken from Penitential Psalm 130, was most likely chosen for its parallel significance in Christianity and Judaism, simultaneously speaking for 260 Christians and 75 Jews killed and buried side by side. The text is written in both Latin and Hebrew: "Clamavi ad Te, Domine";"שיר המעלות, ממעמקים קראתיך י-ה".

== Legacy ==
For a number of reasons, including (but not limited to): the large number of victims; the fact that many of them were innocent civilians casually taken only to make up the number of those to be killed; the cruel methods implemented (even by Nazi standards) to carry out the massacre; the fact that the reprisal order had come directly from Adolf Hitler, and the hiding of the bodies, which were buried summarily instead of being returned to their families – the slaughter became a symbol of the various massacres carried out against civilians in Italy, from 8 September 1943 until the German surrender on 8 May 1945.

In December 2007, Giorgio Bettio, a city councillor of Treviso, Italy and member of the Northern League party, suggested that "With immigrants, we should use the same system the SS used, punish 10 of them for every slight against one of our citizens", in reference to Italy's current debate over immigration policies. This comment was met with public condemnation, and Bettio later said, "I certainly made a mistake in citing the SS". He claimed the incident had been "sensationalized" by the media.

== The Vatican ==
The Vatican's role in the massacre came under particular scrutiny following the publication of Robert Katz's first book, Death in Rome (1967), in which he speculated that Pope Pius XII had advance knowledge of the Nazi orders and did little to forestall it. Katz wrote later that he had put together "circumstantial evidence... from six separate sources, though no single element was conclusive." This charge was vigorously disputed by the Pope's defenders.

In 1974, Katz was sued in the Roman courts by Pius's niece, Countess Elena Pacelli Rossignani. Katz was initially found guilty, but an appeals court overturned this initial ruling. The appeals court decision was in turn appealed by the prosecution. Further evidence ("the Governatorato document" - see below) was revealed; the court case was reconfigured; and Katz was found guilty of "intention to denigrate" Pius XII. Ultimately, however, the case was dismissed without a ruling on the matter at hand, "on the grounds of an amnesty dating back to 1970." Katz continued to publish various accusations against Pius XII until his death.

In 1980, a relevant document ("the Governatorato document") was found in the Vatican archives and released by the Vatican. It was dated 24 March 1944, 10:15 a.m., and contained intelligence gathered only hours after the attack on the SS troops. Addressed to the Papal Secretariat, it showed that the Vatican had indeed heard that the Germans were planning to punish Italian citizens tenfold for the SS deaths. However, the information was received only five hours before the massacre took place; the informant's statement was short and vague as to source; and it provided no information in regards to time, place, or logistics:

L'ing. Ferraro, of the Governatorato of Rome, reports the following details about yesterday's incident: the German victims numbered 26 soldiers; among the Italian civilians there were, unfortunately, three or four deaths; it is not easy to reconstruct what took place because everyone escaped; some apartments were sacked and the German police took complete control of the area, prohibiting any interference by other authorities; in any case, it seems that a column of German vehicles passing through Via Rasella was responsible for provoking the Italians who then hurled grenades from the building alongside Palazzo Tittoni; the counter-measures are not yet known: it is however foreseen that for every German killed 10 Italians will be executed. L'ing. Ferraro hopes to provide further details later.

Katz elaborated on this in 2003 in The Battle for Rome: The Germans, The Allies, The Partisans, and The Pope, September 1943 – June 1944, using evidence from recently released OSS and Vatican sources that certain German diplomats, notably Eugen Dollmann, Himmler's representative in Rome and German Consul Eitel Möllhausen had gone to Pope Pius' personal liaison to the German occupational authorities, Pankratius Pfeiffer, asking him to urge the Pope to intervene and limit reprisals on the grounds that they would inflame the Roman population and make the occupation (and negotiations for a separate peace with the Allies they all fervently wished for) even more difficult.

According to Katz, the Secretariat of the Vatican believed that "the attack on Via Rasella had been undertaken to provoke the occupiers into an excessively repressive act and increase the people's hatred of the Germans. "This was what the Pope's liaison Padre Pancrazio had been told in the Vatican the night before [the reprisal]. It was also the opinion held by Dollman and Möllhausen. None of them seemed to believe that the Partisans meant to hurt the Germans as never before to extend the popularity of the Resistance" nor did they view the Via Rasella attack as a legitimate act of war. Instead, they viewed it as a tragic act of terrorism by Communists, as did the Vatican, and as some of its defenders still do. According to Joseph Lichten, author of a monograph defending Pius XII written after the publication of Rolf Hochhuth's play, The Deputy:

In the absence of documentation, therefore, one is left to surmise that the Pontiff intervened personally, as he had on so many earlier occasions, through his nephew Prince Carlo Pacelli or through the General Superior of the Salvatorian Fathers, Father Pancrazio Pfeiffer. Nor should one be surprised that such a supposed intervention had little chance of success; the order had come from Berlin and, moreover, what argument could a papal emissary use in favour of restraint? For the past several months, the Pope had argued that German restraint would ease the tension in Rome. Suddenly, the entire papal strategy had been undermined by the spectacular and tragic liquidation of 33 German soldiers.

In the aftermath of the massacre, Pope Pius XII debated whether to protest against the massacre but decided not to because, as one of his defenders reported, "all the convents, all the religious houses of Rome were full of refugees, Communists, Jews, democrats and anti-Fascists, ex-generals, etc. Pius XII had even suspended the rules for the cloister. If Pius XII had made a public protest, there would have been searches in all these houses and catastrophe would have ensued".

Instead, a special editorial entitled "The Deeds in Via Rasella" appeared in the "semi-official" Vatican newspaper, the Osservatore Romano, deploring the violence of "the guilty parties who escaped arrest" (presumably the Partisans, however Stephen Walker in his book Hide and Seek writes that "the wording is worthy of examination" and speculates that this is a reference to "the Nazis who rounded up over 300 people and then butchered them.") and urging Roman citizens to continue to exercise restraint to prevent further sacrifices of innocent people. "In the face of such deeds, every honest heart is left profoundly grieved in the name of humanity and Christian sentiment. Thirty-two victims on the one hand, and on the other, three-hundred-and-twenty persons sacrificed for the guilty parties who escaped arrest." Subsequently, the Nazi occupation forces stepped up their hunt among Roman civilians for suspected Resistance supporters, whom it rounded up and tortured.

== Controversy ==
In 1952, the new Italian Supreme Court declared the Via Rasella attack to have been a legitimate act of war after an appeal by Kappler's lawyers of his conviction of guilt in the Ardeatine Massacre.

This decision was reaffirmed in 1999, when the Italian Supreme Court declared the Partisans immune from prosecution after a Roman prosecutor had unsuccessfully attempted to bring a suit against them for the death of the boy Piero Zuccheretti, who had been killed in Via Rasella. Historian Robert Wolfe finds "persuasive" Katz's characterisation of the Pope's decision to condemn the Partisans for the Via Rasella attack, rather than the Nazis for the reprisals, as evidence of "a moral failure" resulting from one of the "great misreadings of history".

In the 1990s, there was a revisionist campaign by Il Giornale, a newspaper owned by Paolo Berlusconi, brother of former Prime Minister Silvio Berlusconi, to re-label the World War II Partisans responsible for the attack on Via Rasella as "terrorists". In response, the Italian Supreme Court of Cassation officially ruled that the act in Via Rasella had been a legitimate act of war and not a terrorist attack and ordered the publisher to pay punitive damages of 45 thousand euro. Nevertheless, some historians, such as Richard Raiber and István Deák, continue to imply that the Partisans were the equivalent of terrorists and were, moreover, responsible for avoidable suffering, thus offering some support for the official judgment of the Vatican at the time.

Historian Patrick Gallo, however, in For Love and Country: The Italian Resistance (2003), posited that the Rome-based Resistance not only undermined German morale but also achieved important strategic objectives and was hence not a useless provocation, as contended by critics, but an act of legitimate military significance in furthering the Allied victory.

Reviewing Katz's book, The Battle for Rome, István Deák, on the other hand, cautions that although "armed resistance during World War II was romanticised because the Nazis were such an appalling enemy and because in that war the guerrillas' targets were still mainly soldiers", it is increasingly hard to draw the line between freedom fighting and terrorism. In his opinion, Hague Conventions regulating irregular warfare has been "more a failure than success". "What is needed," Deák stresses, "is a recognition of reality, namely that future wars will increasingly consist of civilians shooting at soldiers from hiding and frightened soldiers killing innocent civilians. And what is needed, in the aftermath of such a sobering recognition, is an attempt to create a new international law for the more efficient regulation of this type of horrible warfare." Robert Katz's book, The Battle for Rome, Deák concludes, "provides fine arguments for this necessary debate".

== Post-war fates of leading figures in the events ==
Immediately after the war Roman Partisan leaders, including Rosario Bentivegna, the medical student who had set off the Via Rasella bomb, were recipients of medals conferred by the post-war Italian government.

Both Priebke and Kappler sought Vatican assistance after the war. Priebke escaped from a British prison camp in 1946 and fled, first to the Tyrol and then back to Rome, whence, using false papers supplied by the Vatican "ratline", he emigrated to Argentina. He was unmasked on camera in 1994 during a television interview by ABC television reporter Sam Donaldson, brought back to Italy for trial, and sentenced to house arrest in the home of his lawyer, Paolo Giachini. He died on 11 October 2013 from natural causes at age 100. His last request to have his remains returned to Argentina to be buried alongside his wife was denied by Argentina. The Vatican issued an "unprecedented ban" on holding the funeral in any Catholic church in Rome. But the Society of St Pius X, a Catholic splinter group often accused of having far-right and anti-Semitic leanings, offered to hold the ceremony in the city of Albano Laziale. During the funeral service, violent clashes broke out between fascist sympathisers and anti-fascist protesters.

Don Florian Abrahamowicz, a priest expelled from the Society of St Pius X for his extreme right-wing views, told Italy's Radio 24: "Priebke was a friend of mine, a Christian, a faithful soldier."

Kappler, a Protestant until his late conversion in life, unsuccessfully sought asylum within the Vatican. Tried by the British and sentenced to life imprisonment in Gaeta, in 1977 he successfully escaped from a Roman military hospital where he had been undergoing treatment for cancer. He died unmolested the following year at his home in Soltau, West Germany, the West Germans having refused Italian requests to extradite him.

== Dramatisations ==
The event was recreated in the 1962 film Dieci italiani per un tedesco (Via Rasella) (Ten Italians for One German (Rasella Street)) directed by Filippo Walter Ratti and starring Gino Cervi.

In 1973, the feature film Massacre in Rome by George Pan Cosmatos was released starring Marcello Mastroianni and Richard Burton.

American composer William Schuman subtitled his Ninth Symphony, from 1968, "Le fosse Ardeatine" ("The Ardeatine Caves") in memory of the victims.

The 2017 novel entitled From Sand and Ash by Amy Harmon details a fictional account of the massacre.

== See also ==
- List of massacres in Italy
- Appian Way Regional Park
- Museum of the Liberation of Rome
