= Eberhard von Mackensen =

German general & war criminal (1889-1969)

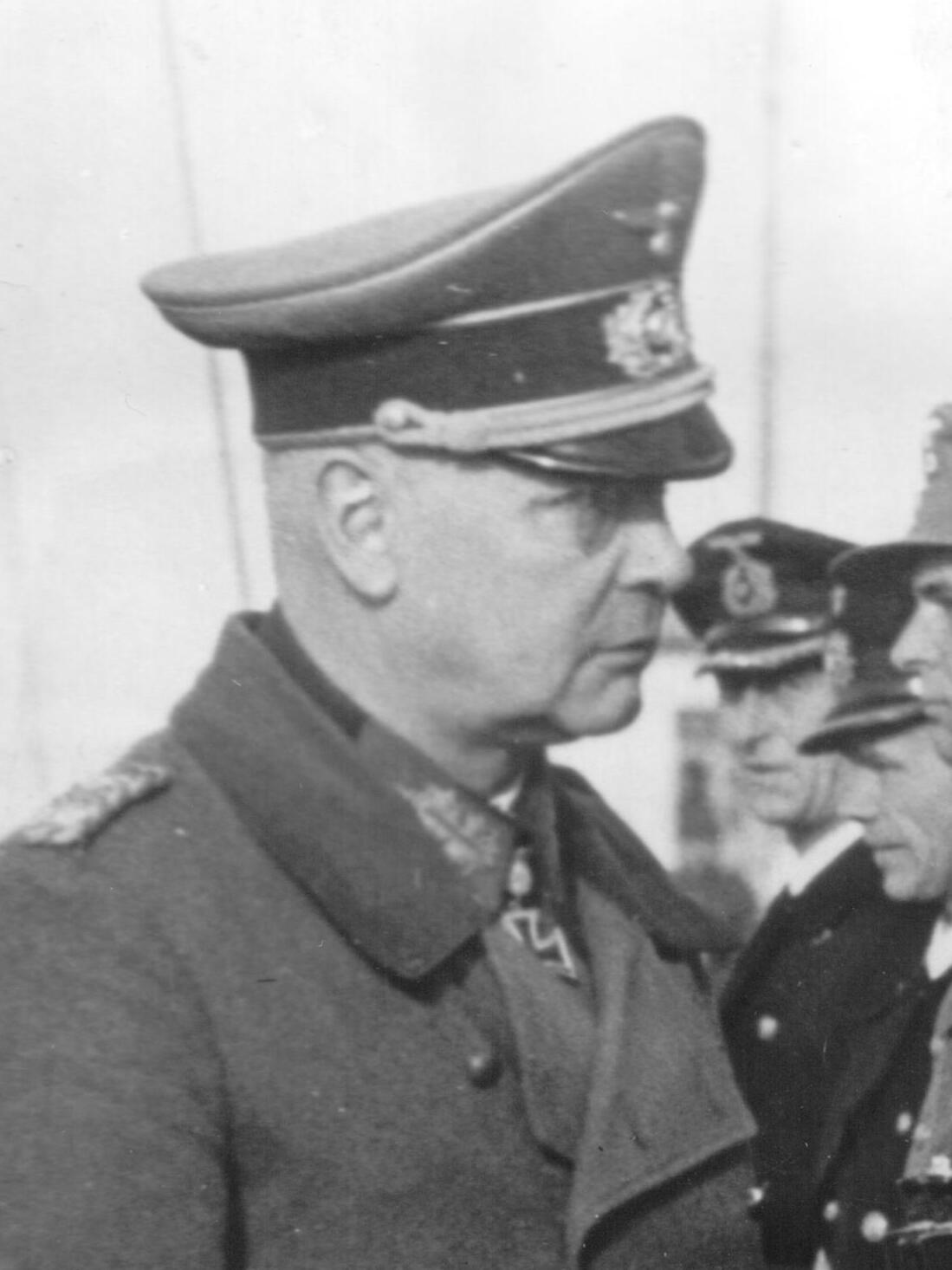
- Mackensen in 1944
- Born: 24 September 1889; Bromberg, Kingdom of Prussia, German Empire
- Died: 19 May 1969 (aged 79); Neumünster, Schleswig-Holstein, West Germany
- Relatives: August von Mackensen (father); Hans Georg von Mackensen (brother)
- Military career
- Allegiance: German Empire; Weimar Republic; Nazi Germany
- Branch: German Army
- Service years: 1906–1944
- Rank: Generaloberst
- Commands: III Army Corps; III Panzer Corps; 1st Panzer Army; 14th Army
- Known for: Ardeatine massacre
- Conflicts: World War I; World War II; Invasion of Poland; Operation Barbarossa; Battle of Kiev (1941); Second Battle of Kharkov; Third Battle of Kharkov; Italian Campaign; Battle of Monte Cassino; Operation Diadem
- Awards: Knight's Cross of the Iron Cross with Oak Leaves

Friedrich August Eberhard von Mackensen (24 September 1889 – 19 May 1969) was a German general and war criminal during World War II who served as commander of the 1st Panzer Army and the 14th Army. Following the war, Mackensen stood trial for war crimes before a British military tribunal in Italy where he was convicted and sentenced to death for his involvement in the Ardeatine massacre, in which hundreds of Italian civilians and political prisoners were shot. The sentence was later commuted and Mackensen was released in 1952. He died in West Germany in 1969.

== Early life ==
Eberhard was born on 24 September 1889, in Bromberg, Kingdom of Prussia, German Empire, the fourth of five children to Field Marshal August von Mackensen and his wife Dorothea (née von Horn). Mackensen joined the Imperial German Army in 1906, where he became a Fahnenjunker (officer candidate) in the XVII Corps stationed in Danzig, and was promoted to lieutenant on 22 March 1910.

== Military career ==
At the outbreak of the First World War in 1914, Mackensen served as a regimental adjutant in the 1st Hussar Regiment. On 25 February 1915, he was promoted to first lieutenant, but after a severe wound on 23 August 1915, Mackensen was transferred to a staff job in the General Staff of the Army Group Scholtz. On 20 May 1917, he was promoted to captain.

Following the armistice in 1918 ending the war, Mackensen remained in the army (now the Reichswehr of the Weimar Republic) where he served as chief of the 1st squadron of the 5th (Prussian) Rider Regiment in Belgard, but in 1919 also joined a right-wing paramilitary Freikorps and fought in the Baltic states. In 1925, Mackensen commanded the army transport department of the German General Staff of the Ministry of the Reichswehr in Berlin. After his appointment as a major on 1 February 1928, he served on the staff of the 1st Cavalry Division in Frankfurt (Oder) from 1930. In this position, he was promoted to lieutenant colonel on 1 October 1932.

From 1 November 1933, Mackensen was made chief of the staff of the General Inspectorate of the Cavalry, and was promoted to colonel on 1 September 1934. Mackensen became chief of staff of the X Army Corps in Hamburg, the successor of the cavalry in the newly-formed Wehrmacht. In 1937, Mackensen became commander of the 1st Cavalry Brigade in Insterburg. Mackensen was appointed major general on 1 January 1938, and on 1 May 1939 became commander in the Army Group Command V in Vienna, where he became chief of staff under Field Marshal Wilhelm List.

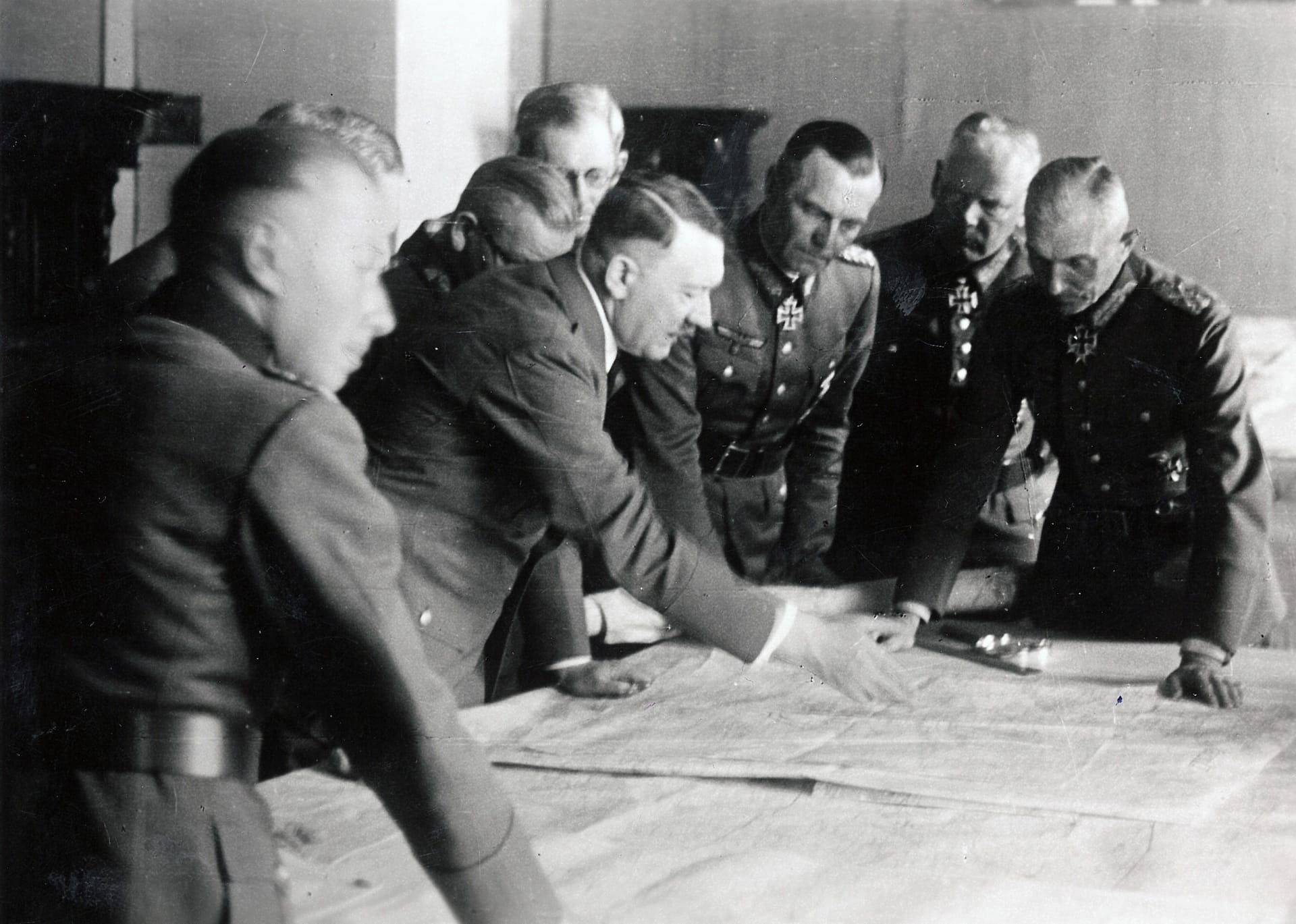
Mackensen (2nd from right), between Paulus (l.) and von Bock (r.), June 1942

At the beginning of World War II in September 1939, Mackensen served as the chief of staff of the German 14th Army in the invasion of Poland. Later, he was made chief of staff of the 12th Army that fought in the Battle of France. On 1 January 1940, he was promoted to lieutenant general and eight months later to General der Kavallerie. On 15 January 1941, Mackensen was made commanding general of III Army Corps, part of the 1st Panzer Army in Army Group South. Mackensen's forces were the first to reach Kiev at the First Battle of Kiev during the German invasion of the Soviet Union. On 27 July 1941, he received the Knight's Cross of the Iron Cross. For his achievements in the Second Battle of Kharkov, Mackensen was honoured on 26 May 1942 with the oak leaves to his knight's cross. In November 1942, when General Paul Ewald von Kleist was given the command of Army Group A, Mackensen took up leadership of the 1st Panzer Army in the Third Battle of Kharkov in March 1943, and was promoted to colonel general (Generaloberst) on 6 July 1943. Shortly after his promotion to Generaloberst, Mackensen was transferred to Italy as commander of the 14th Army. After the Allies broke through the Winter Line during Operation Diadem, Kesselring fired Mackensen for disobeying orders and the latter retired from active service in the army in the summer of 1944.

== War crime, trial and conviction ==
On 24 March 1944, SS members shot and killed 335 Italian civilians in the Ardeatine Caves massacre in retaliation for the deaths of 32 German police troops in a bomb attack by Italian partisans. The mass execution of civilians was ordered by Adolf Hitler in consultation with Generaloberst Alfred Jodl and Field Marshal Albert Kesselring. Mackensen was at the time commander of the 14th Army and subordinate to Kesselring as well as the superior of Lieutenant-General Kurt Mälzer, military commandant of Rome. All three were subsequently convicted of war crimes.

Following the unconditional surrender of Nazi Germany in 1945 Mackensen became a prisoner of war, and on 30 November 1946 he was found guilty of war crimes by a British military court, in Rome, and sentenced to death. In mid-1947, his sentence was commuted to a 21-year imprisonment. He was released on 2 October 1952, after serving five years.

Following his release, Mackensen lived a secluded life in Alt Mühlendorf (now in Warder in the Rendsburg-Eckernförde district), near Nortorf in Schleswig-Holstein, West Germany.

== Death ==
Mackensen died on 19 May 1969 in Neumünster, aged 79 years old.

== Awards ==
- Iron Cross (1914) 2nd & 1st Class
- Clasp to the Iron Cross 2nd Class (17 September 1939) & 1st Class (2 October 1939)
- Knight's Cross of the Iron Cross with Oak Leaves
  - Knight's Cross on 27 July 1941 as General der Kavallerie and commander of III. Armeekorps
  - Oak Leaves on 26 May 1942 as General der Kavallerie and commander of III. Armeekorps

Military offices
Preceded by Kurt von Greiff	Commander of III Corps; 15 January 1941 – 31 March 1942	Succeeded by Leo Geyr von Schweppenburg
Preceded by Leo Geyr von Schweppenburg	Commander of III Corps; 20 July 1942 – 2 January 1943	Succeeded by Hermann Breith
Preceded by Generalfeldmarschall Paul Ludwig Ewald von Kleist	Commander of 1. Panzerarmee; 21 November 1942 – 29 October 1943	Succeeded by Generaloberst Hans-Valentin Hube
Preceded by Wilhelm List	Commander of 14th Army; 5 November 1943 – 4 June 1944	Succeeded by Joachim Lemelsen
