= Kurt Mälzer =

German Luftwaffe general & war criminal (1894-1952)

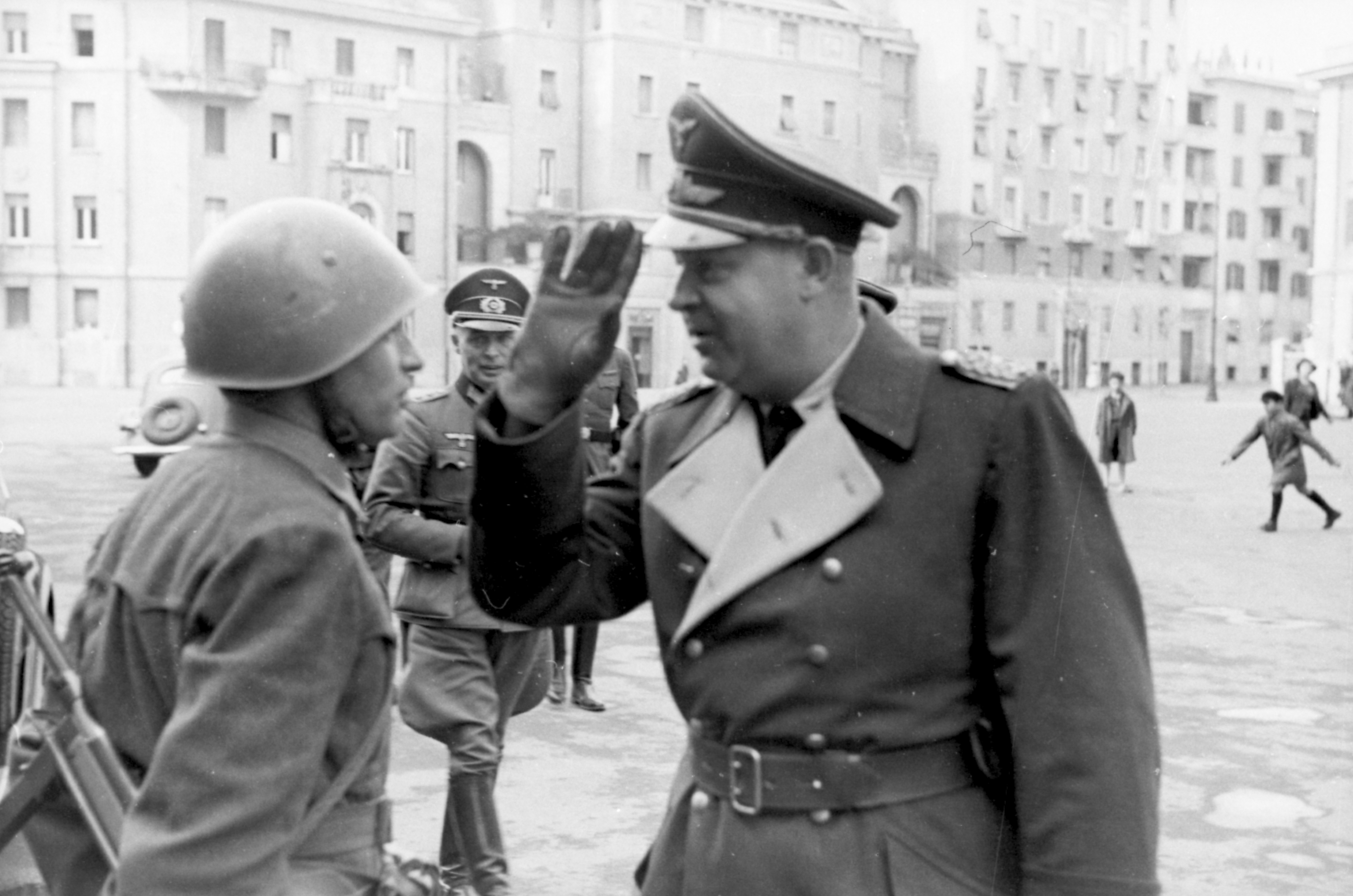
- Mälzer inspecting Italian troops of the X MAS in Piazza Bainsizza, Rome, around the time this unit was deployed to counter the Allied beachhead at Anzio (February–March 1944)
- Born: 2 August 1894; Altenburg, German Empire
- Died: 24 March 1952 (aged 57); Werl Prison, Werl, West Germany
- Known for: Ardeatine massacre
- Status: Deceased
- Convictions: U.S. Military; War crimes British Military; War crimes
- Penalty: U.S. Military; 10 years imprisonment; commuted to 3 years imprisonment British Military; Death; commuted to life imprisonment
- Military career
- Allegiance: German Empire; Nazi Germany
- Branch: Luftwaffe
- Service years: 1914–1945
- Rank: Generalleutnant

Kurt Mälzer (2 August 1894 – 24 March 1952) was a German general of the Luftwaffe and a war criminal during World War II. In 1943, Mälzer was appointed the military commander of the city of Rome, subordinated to General Eberhard von Mackensen under the overall command of Field Marshal Albert Kesselring. Under his authority, Mälzer commanded not only the garrison Wehrmacht troops in Rome itself, but also indirectly the SS security forces in the city (although these troops were nominally under the authority of the SS and Police Leader of the region, Wilhelm Harster).

Mälzer was one of the German commanders in Rome directly responsible for the Ardeatine massacre in March 1944. Mälzer ordered the massacre, which was then planned and carried out by the SS troops. After the war, Mälzer was put on trial by the Allies and sentenced to death, later commuted to a prison term. He died in prison in 1952 of natural causes.

== Early career ==
Upon the outbreak of World War I in 1914, Mälzer joined the Prussian Army as a Cadet. He served on the Western Front for the duration of the war, receiving the Iron Cross, First Class. In 1918, he completed pilot training; however, the war ended before Mälzer could be assigned to an active squadron. As a Leutnant, Mälzer remained in the peacetime Reichswehr and was assigned as a Platoon Officer in the 4th Automotive Department. Between 1923 and 1924, he trained as an artillery officer, was promoted to Oberleutnant in 1925, and was assigned as a battery commander in the 4th Artillery Regiment. In 1928, he was assigned to extended educational duties and studied at the Technische Hochschule in Charlottenburg (now Technische Universität Berlin). In 1933, Mälzer received a certificate as a graduate engineer (today's equivalent to a Master's degree) and was thereafter assigned to the German Ministry of Defense. By 1935, he had risen to the rank of Major.

With the founding of the Luftwaffe, Mälzer transferred into the German Air Force, first assigned to a Flight Technical School, later becoming a flight instructor at the Air Technical Academy in Berlin-Gatow. In 1937, he was promoted to Oberstleutnant (lieutenant colonel) and assigned to command the 255th Combat Wing stationed at Landsberg am Lech.

== World War II ==
Promoted to Oberst (Colonel) in 1939, upon the outbreak of World War II Mälzer was assigned as a staff officer of Luftflotte 2. After serving in Poland and France, he was posted as the Air District Commander of Brussels on 28 May 1940. Promoted to Generalmajor in 1941, he became a Department Head in the German Ministry of Aviation until September 1943 when he transferred to command Flugbereitschaft 17 in Vienna. On 1 October 1943, he was promoted to Generalleutnant and ordered to become garrison commander and commandant of the occupied city of Rome.

== Military Commander of Rome ==
Mälzer had become military commander of Rome on 30 October 1943. In 1944 he became involved in the Ardeatine massacre. Since Rome had become a city close to the front, the power to decide about retaliatory measures after partisan attacks lay with the commanders of the Wehrmacht, i.e. Mälzer, Eberhard von Mackensen and Albert Kesselring. In that respect Herbert Kappler, head of the SD in Rome, was Mälzer's subordinate. Shortly after the bombing of the German SS Police Regiment 'Bozen' on 23 March 1944, an apparently intoxicated Mälzer appeared at the scene of the crime and ordered to blow up the blocks of houses at the Via Rasella immediately. He also threatened to have all the people who had been arrested at the Via Rasella shot. It was Kappler who later claimed to have talked Mälzer out of his plan. Instead Mälzer proceeded to inform Kesselring.

The chain of command which led to the following massacre of 335 Italian civilians, political prisoners and Jews on 24 March 1944 is not entirely clear. In their respective trials after the war, Mälzer, Mackensen and Kesselring claimed that they acted under direct order from Adolf Hitler, and that the shooting of 330 Italians already sentenced to death was to be planned and carried out by the SD under Kappler. Historian Joachim Staron questions the existence of a "Führer's order", since neither general mentioned such an order during interrogations before their trials. On the witness stand Kappler argued that he had received orders from Kesselring, and suggested that at least Mälzer knew that the Germans did not have 330 prisoners under the sentence of death. In September 1946, Mälzer was sentenced to 10 years in prison by an American military court for parading U.S. POWs through the streets of Rome. His sentence was reduced to three years on appeal.

On 30 November 1946, Mälzer and Mackensen were sentenced to death by a British military court at the University of Rome. After Kesselring had been sentenced to death on 6 May 1947, his sentence as well as Mälzer's and Mackensen's were commuted to life imprisonment shortly thereafter. Mälzer died in Werl Prison in March 1952.

Kurt Mälzer is a main character in the film Massacre in Rome, and is portrayed by actor Leo McKern.
