= Mario Fiorentini =

Italian partisan and spy (1918–2022)

- Fiorentini, c. 1940
- Born: 7 November 1918; Rome, Italy
- Died: 9 August 2022 (aged 103); Rome, Italy
- Military career
- Allegiance: Italian resistance
- Branch: Volunteer Corps of Freedom (Corpo volontari della libertà)
- Service years: September 1943 – May 1945
- Rank: Commander
- Nicknames: Gandi, Finch, Dino
- Battles: World War II; Italian Resistance Wars; Roman Resistance Campaigns
- Awards: Silver Medal of Military Valor (3); War Merit Cross (3)

Mario Fiorentini (7 November 1918 – 9 August 2022) was an Italian partisan, spy, mathematician, and academic, for years a professor of geometry at the University of Ferrara. He engaged in numerous partisan actions, including the assault on the entrance to the Regina Coeli prison and participating in the organization of the Via Rasella attack. He was Italy's most decorated World War II partisan.

== Biography ==
=== Youth ===
Fiorentini was born in Rome to Maria Moscatelli and Pacifico Fiorentini on 7 November 1918. His mother, a Catholic, moved to Rome from Cittaducale in search of work, like many other young people at the time; his father, who was Jewish, worked as an accountant and bankruptcy trustee.

=== During the war ===
As a student, Fiorentini collaborated clandestinely with Giustizia e Libertà and with the Communist Party. At the beginning of 1943, he set up with Plinio De Martiis performances at Mazzini Theater and at Delle Arti with actors such as Vittorio Gassman, Lea Padovani, Nora Ricci, Vittorio Caprioli, Carlo Mazzarella, Alberto Bonucci and Ave Ninchi, directed by Luigi Squarzina, Adolfo Celi, and Mario Landi. Later he met Lucia Ottobrini, who became his partner.

After 25 July 1943, with Antonello Trombadori, he formed a group of partisans known as Arditi del Popolo. On 9 September 1943, Fiorentini took part in the battle against the Germans at Porta San Paolo among the ranks of the members of the Action Party; in October he organized and placed himself in command of the central Patriotic Action Groups (GAP), in the IV operational area "Roma centro", taking the battle name of "John"; this formation, together with the GAP Carlo Pisacane, belonged to the partisan structure belonging to the network commanded by Carlo Salinari.

A first GAP action, in which Mario Fiorentini, Rosario Bentivegna (Paolo) and Franco di Lernia (Pietro) took part, was organized to assassinate the Minister of the Interior of Salò Guido Buffarini Guidi and the hierarch Francesco Maria Barracu, intent on dining in a restaurant near Piazza Navona; the action was canceled at the last moment, when the commando was already in place (October 1943). On 31 October, Lucia Ottobrini was added to the three, with cover duties, for an action in Corso Vittorio Emanuele II. The Gappists killed three RSI soldiers, who came out of Palazzo Braschi, after following them almost to Piazza Venezia.

His parents were arrested and taken to the military college of Palazzo Salviati, near the Regina Coeli prison during the Raid of the Ghetto of Rome on 16 October 1943, even though they lived outside the ghetto, in via Capo le Case. The two, along with hundreds of other people, were to have been loaded onto trains to be deported but she bribed a guard with the family jewels, thus managing to escape and take refuge with her sister.

Mario likewise managed to elude capture that day. He had slept at his parents' home the night before and had bombs hidden under his bed, but was not found because the house was not searched; he escaped by fleeing over the roofs.

On 18 November, Fiorentini was responsible for covering some of the Pisacane gappists who entered the Teatro Adriano, having learned that the following day General Stahel, commander of the square in Rome, would be present among high-ranking German officers and republican fascist authorities (including the marshal Rodolfo Graziani). The partisans of the Pisacane placed a fire extinguisher filled with about 3 kg of TNT and equipped with a clockwork device under the stage, but the device failed to explode.

On the evening of 17 December 1943, with Lucia Ottobrini, Carla Capponi and Rosario Bentivegna, Fiorentini took part in an action against a German officer with a bag full of documents. The officer was killed by Capponi and Bentivegna who seized the bag and handed it over to the military junta.

The next day, the quartet was assigned with placing a bomb at the exit of the Barberini cinema, frequented by German soldiers. The attack brought about the death of eight soldiers, as well as an unspecified number of wounded.

On 26 December, while a group composed of Ottobrini, Capponi, Bentivegna and Di Lernia was covering the action, Fiorentini threw an explosive package containing two kilograms of TNT while bicycling past the entrance of Regina Coeli prison, at the moment when 28 German soldiers were changing the guard, causing 5 deaths and about 20 wounded; another 2 would soon be dead. Fiorentini managed to escape the shots fired by other soldiers leaning out of the prison windows. The next day an ordinance was issued by the German military command prohibiting the use of bicycles in Rome.

On 10 March 1944, Fiorentini, with Ottobrini, Bentivegna and Franco Ferri, coming out from behind the kiosks of the market in Piazza Monte d'Oro, threw bombs at a procession of fascists in via Tomacelli, causing three deaths and numerous injuries. They then vanished, in an action which, due to its technical perfection, already prefigures the next Via Rasella attack.

It was Fiorentini who noticed, from his hiding place near via del Tritone, the daily passage of the South Tyrolean policemen of the SS Police Regiment Bozen. Further surveillance showed that the most suitable place for an attack, along the way of the ward, would be the narrow via Rasella, where the Germans were passing punctually at 2 pm. The choice was approved by Giorgio Amendola, the Communist member of the military junta. Amendola later declared that he too had noticed the daily passage of the company in Piazza di Spagna.

Fiorentini was excluded from participation in action of 23 March 1944 because he risked being recognized by a relative. The attack killed thirty-three soldiers and wounded about fifty; there were two casualties among civilians but no casualties among the Gappists. The Germans responded the following day with the Ardeatine massacre.

On 23 March 2012, while being interviewed by the newspaper Il Messaggero in Rome, Fiorentini said that he only became aware of the reprisal in the next month, but that, in any case, the danger of reprisals was a constant danger and that the alternative of not acting anyway "would have been an error".

In the following weeks, Fiorentini and Ottobrini left Rome to direct GAP operations between Tivoli, Lazio, and Castel Madama. After the liberation of Rome, starting from July 1944, Fiorentini was placed in command of the "Dingo" mission, under the American Office of Strategic Services (OSS), and continued the resistance in Northern Italy (Emilia and Liguria).

=== After the war ===
After World War II, Fiorentini turned down an offer to run for the parliament and instead pursued a degree in mathematics. From 1964 he dealt with mathematical research, focusing mainly on homological methods in commutative algebra and algebraic geometry, in close connection with the more advanced ideas of Alexander Grothendieck and his school. From 1 November 1971 he was full professor of higher geometry at the University of Ferrara.

He dedicated himself to spreading mathematics in schools, collaborating with many young people, such as Ascanio Celestini and Veronica Cruciani. He was responsible for the "rediscovery" of the figure of Giorgio Marincola. The research of Mario Fiorentini was dedicated in June 1997. His most significant works have recently been collected and published by Paulo Ribenboim.

In 2013, a documentary was made, called L'uomo dai quattro nomi (The Man With The Four Names), (Note: To hide from the Nazi-Fascists, Fiorentini changed identity several times during the war.) directed by Claudio Costa, in which Fiorentini tells his story in the Resistance.

In November 2018, on the occasion of his hundredth birthday, various initiatives took place: on 7 November a book-interview about him was released, The Last Gappista, written by Mirko Bettozzi, containing a critical note by Duccio Trombadori. Celebrations were held in the Federico Di Donato primary school in Rome in the Esquilino district on 13 November 2018 in which a new book written in collaboration with Ennio Peres was presented to Fiorentini. Ascanio Celestini, who read some fairy tales and Sara Modigliani, who sang partisan songs, performed for the occasion.

Fiorentini died on 9 August 2022, at the age of 103.

== Honours ==
- Silver Medal of Military Valor (Rome, 11 March 1943)
- Silver Medal of Military Valor (Rome, 26 December 1943)
- Silver Medal of Military Valor (Northern Italy, July 1944 – April 1945)
- War Merit Cross (September 1943 – June 1944)
- War Merit Cross
- War Merit Cross

== Works ==
- "On relative regular sequences"
- Esempi di anelli di Cohen-Macaulay semifattoriali che non sono di Gorenstein (Examples of semifactorial Cohen-Macaulay rings that are not Gorenstein's)
- Esempi di anelli di Cohen-Macaulay che non sono di Gorenstein (Examples of Cohen-Macaulay rings that are not Gorenstein's)
- with F. van Oystaeyen, "Commutative algebra and algebraic geometry"
- with Aldo Marruccelli, Complements of modern mathematics
- with L. Badescu, Criteri di semifattorialità e di fattorialità per gli anelli locali con applicazioni geometriche (Semi-factorial and factorial criteria for local rings with geometric applications)
- with Alexandru T. Lascu, A formula of enumerative geometry
