= History of women in the Italian Resistance =

Italian-Partisan Movement

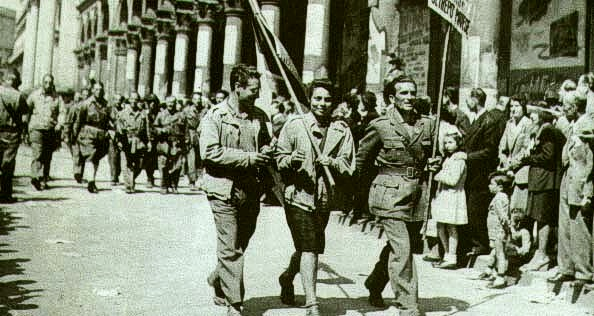
Partisans parade through the streets of Milan immediately after the Liberation. In the center, with the Italian tricolour flag, is Eva Colombo.

The history of women in the Italian Resistance plays a key role for the partisan movement in the fight against fascism during World War II. They fought to regain their country's freedom and justice by holding functions of primary importance.

Everywhere in Italy, partisan women fought everyday to recover the basic necessities for the sustenance of their companions and transported resources as they were considered less dangerous. There were organized groups of women who carried out anti-fascist propaganda, raised funds and organized assistance to political prisoners and were also engaged in maintaining communications as well as in military operations.

The women who participated in the Resistance were part of organizations such as the Groups of Patriotic Resistance (GAP) and the Patriotic Action Teams (SAP), and also founded Women's Defense Groups and for the Assistance of the Freedom Fighters (GDD), "open to all women from all walks of life, with any political idea or religious faith, who would like to take part in the work of liberation of their homeland and fight for their own emancipation". The Women's Defense Groups and for the Assistance of the Freedom Fighters (GDD) were also intended to guarantee the rights of women, often become heads of families, while their husbands were enrolled in the army. From inside the factories (where they had taken the place of the men engaged in the war), they organized strikes and demonstrations against fascism.

== Roles ==
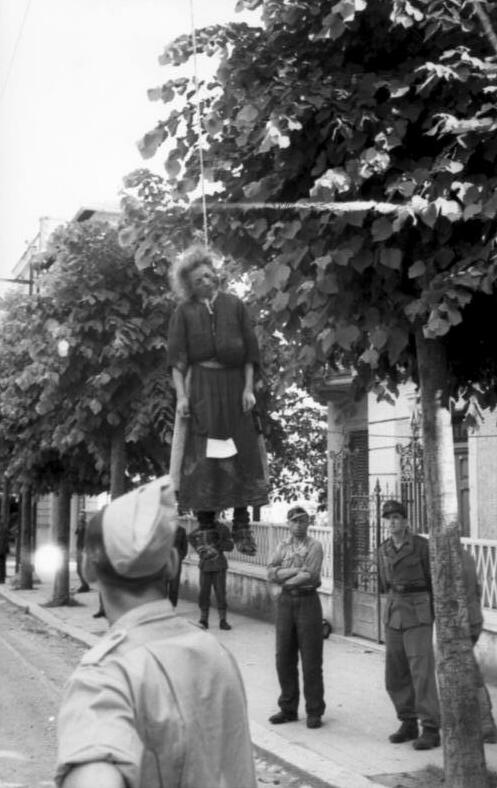
Woman hanged by the Nazi Fascists from a tree in Rome. On the skirt there is a sign with the accusations for which she was summarily executed. Around her, German soldiers. Photo from the Nazi war propaganda, from the "Deutsches Bundesarchiv", 1944.

The tasks covered by women in the Italian Resistance were assigned frequently: they established the first aid teams to help injured and sick people, they contributed in the collection of clothing, food and medicines, they took care of the assistance of the corpses and of the assistance to the family members of the fallen.

They were fundamental to the partisan community: in addition to cooking, washing, sewing and assisting the wounded, women took part in meetings and gave their political and organizational contributions, moreover, if needed, they also knew how to try their hand at weapons. Their communication tasks was particularly valuable: with cunning they often managed to pass through enemy checkpoints in order to reach their destination, so they could contact the military and give them information about new movements.

Their actions were considered as risky as those of men; when they were captured, they were tortured. They were considered really clever at camouflaging weapons and ammunition: when they were noticed by the Germans with something incriminating, they often managed to avoid the search by declaring important tasks to carry out, like taking care of sick family members or hungry children.

In the era of the Second World War, women also acquired an important role on an economic-productive level. While men were called to arms, they had to replace them in industry and agriculture. Women worked mainly in the textile, food and industrial sectors, but they were also present to a large extent in the assembly line, in public employment and in the fields, where the most tiring activities, traditionally reserved for men.

In these sectors, they often organized demonstrations, shouting slogans such as "We want to live in peace" or "We want bread, enough with the speculators". Especially in the countryside, they made their homes available at their own risk in order to help the wounded, convalescents and refuge for fleeing people. Women also carried out fundraising, aimed at helping the families of the arrested, the victims of the Nazi fascists and also the families of partisans who were particularly needy. Their political propaganda was also very intense, as well as their acts of sabotage and occupation of the German food stores.

=== Partisan couriers, or "staffette" ===
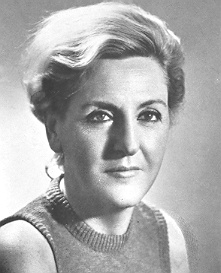
Carla Capponi

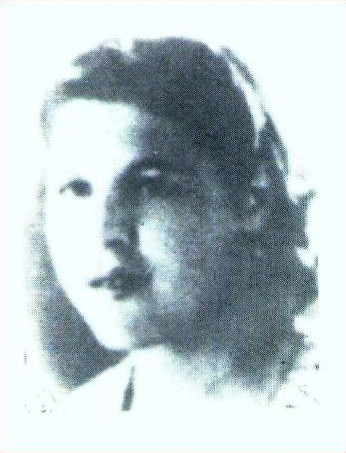
Stefanina Moro, one of the so-called "staffette", or partisan couriers. She was captured and tortured to death by the Nazis when she was 17.

The role of the courier was often held by young women aged between 16 and 18, simply because they were thought to arouse less suspicion and were therefore not subjected to searches. The staffette had both the task of guaranteeing the connections between the various brigades and also of maintaining contacts between the partisans and their families.

Within the brigade, the staffette also often had the fundamental role of nurse, keeping in contact with the doctors and pharmacists to treat the soldiers' wounds and—in some cases–lice.

The staffette were not armed and therefore their task was very dangerous. Their goal was to go unnoticed: therefore they dressed plainly, but with a double-bottomed bag to hide everything they had to carry. They played a key role in order to liaise between the city and the mountains since the very beginning of the guerrilla. Especially in the most difficult moments, the staffette recovered and rescued many injured and restored almost all the connections interrupted by the enemy operations.

They traveled kilometers by bicycle, on foot, sometimes by bus and by truck, sometimes packed in a train together with the cattle, to bring news, transport weapons and ammunition, in the rain and wind, between the bombing and machine guns, even if every time they faced the danger to fall into the hands of the Nazifascists.

During the movements, they were always on the front line: when the partisan unit arrived near an inhabited center, it was the courier that first entered the village to make sure there were no enemies and to give the green light to the partisans in order to go on. The figure of the staffette was highly respected given that their important role was most recognized for the danger they faced. One of the staffette who was awarded the Gold Medal of Military Valour is Carla Capponi, an Italian partisan who died in 2000.

=== Fighters ===
There were many women who fought as partisans against Nazi-fascism. The 1st detachment of female fighters arose in Piedmont in the middle of 1944, and the "Eusebio Giambone" Brigade was one of the many partisan brigades born during the Resistance, mainly linked to the Communist party, but also members of the National Liberation Committee, of the Italian Socialist Party, of the Action Party or of the Christian Democracy, another one arose in Genoa which took the name of a patriot shot by fascists, a battalion was born in 1944 in Biella and was made up of textile workers from the "Nedo" Brigade.

They took up arms and in some cases were chosen as team leaders and directed the entire brigade.

An example is that given by Carla Capponi, who participated in the Roman Resistance and became deputy commander of a formation operating in Rome. Her companions had prevented her from possessing weapons, because they preferred that she take care of other duties; so in October 1943, on a crowded bus, Carla stole a gun from a GNR soldier who was at her side. In 1944, she was among the organizers of the via Rasella attack against a formation of the German army (from this act the Nazis took pretext for the massacre of the Fosse Ardeatine). She was decorated with the Gold Medal of Military Valour for the numerous enterprises in which it participated and was recognized as a partisan fighter with the role of captain.

Using weapons, women invaded a predominantly male world at the time, but they did not do so to feel important: it was a matter of necessity in a situation where it was right to collaborate for a cause that involved the entire population.

In the formations in the early times there were protests by some partisans, against the female presence, but in the end even the most skeptical had to change their mind. Women fought in combat in the mountains and in the cold and in some cases they dedicated themselves to real military sabotage actions while putting their lives at risk. A real friendship between male and female partisans was created within the brigades, with the exception of some exceptions that were denounced and discussed severely. Above all, the women brought strong moral support within the group, essential in those difficult moments. Many female combatants were captured and tortured, taken to concentration camps and then sentenced to death.

=== Representatives of institutions ===
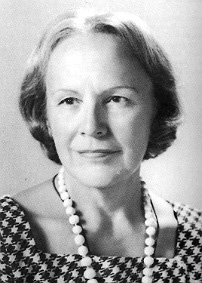
Nilde Iotti

In the geo-political realities created during the war of liberation, women also covered roles of institutional responsibility. This is the case of Gisella Floreanini, the first woman in Italy to hold a government post in the partisan Republic of Ossola, between September and October 1944. A cultured and intelligent woman, she immediately became a point of reference for Italian anti-fascists. She was responsible for women's defense groups and was entrusted with the role of Commissioner for assistance and relations with the mass organizations of the Republic of Ossola. Her contribution in the "forty days of freedom" of the Republic of Ossola (this Republic existed from September 2 to October 22, 1944), the partisans attacked the fascist troops defeating them and thus proclaiming the republic. For this reason this period is called "forty days of freedom" was so essential that it became its symbol. Between 1944 and 1945, she reached the Garibaldian formations in Valsesia and continued the struggle. At that time, she became President of the committee for the organization of women. At the end of the conflict she was appointed member of the National Council and was subsequently elected deputy to the Chamber of Deputies. Another woman who held political roles in the Resistance was Nilde Iotti. At a very young age she followed in the footsteps of her father, who died when she was still a teenager, and joined the PCI (Italian Communist Party). His first function in the Resistance was to carry orders. His first important commitment was that of responsible for women's defense groups essential in the collection of clothing, medicines, food for partisans. After the Italian Institutional Referendum of June 2, 1946, Nilde Iotti was elected to Parliament, first as a simple deputy and then as a member of the Constituent Assembly and helped to create article 3 of the Constitution of Italy where the equality of citizens was sanctioned: "All citizens have equal social dignity and are equal before the law, without distinction of sex, race, language, religion, political opinions, personal and social conditions."

== Sources ==
=== Novels ===
- Guido Gerosa, Le compagne, Rizzoli, Milano, 1979
- Renata Viganò, L'Agnese va a morire, Eianudi, Torino 1949

=== Monographs ===
- Adris Tagliabracci, Le 4 ragazze dei GAP: Carla Capponi, Marisa Musu, Lucia Ottobrini, Maria Teresa Regard, in "Il Contemporaneo", ottobre 1964
- Consiglio Regionale della Liguria, La donna nella Resistenza in Liguria, La nuova Italia, Firenze 1979
- Marina Addis Saba, "Partigiane. Le donne della resistenza", Mursia, Milano 1998
- Comitato Provinciale per le celebrazioni del cinquantenario della Resistenza, Commissione Provinciale Pari Opportunità, A piazza delle Erbe. L'amore, la forza, il coraggio delle donne di Massa Carrara, Amministrazione Provinciale di Massa Carrara, 2001
- Vittorio Civitella, La collina delle lucertole, Gammarò, Sestri Levante, 2008
- Giovannino Verna e Cinzia Maria Rossi, Filomena delli Castelli, una donna abruzzese alla Costituente e al Parlamento italiano, Edigrafital, Teramo, 2006
- Cinzia Maria Rossi, Manuale di democrazia, il dibattito femminile alla Costituente su parità, famiglia e lavoro, Ianieri, Pescara, 2009
- Pino Casamassima, Bandite! Brigantesse e partigiane. Il ruolo delle donne col fucile in spalla, Stampa Alternativa/Nuovi Equilibri, Viterbo, 2012
- Patrizia Pacini, La Costituente: storia di Teresa Mattei, Milano, Altreconomia, 2013
- Laura Artioli, Storia delle storie di Lucia Sarzi, Perugia, Corsiero editore, 2014
- Laura Orlandini, La democrazia delle donne. I Gruppi di Difesa della Donna nella costruzione della Repubblica (1943 - 45), Roma, Bradypus, 2018.
