= Marisa Musu =

Marsisa Musu
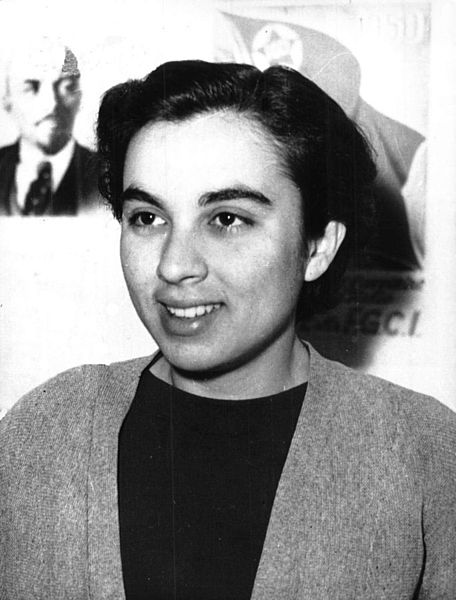
- Musu in 1950
- Born: 19 April 1925; Rome, Italy
- Died: 3 November 2002 (aged 77); Rome, Italy
- Other name: Rosa
- Occupations: Partisan, activist
- Known for: Member of the Italian resistance movement
- Political party: Italian Communist Party
- Awards: Silver Medal of Military Valor

Marisa Musu (18 April 1925 – 3 November 2002) was an Italian anti-fascist resistance fighter, journalist and political activist.

== Biography ==
=== Early life ===
Musu was born in to a prominent anti-fascist family. Her parents Domenico Musu and Bastianina Martini, natives of Sassari, were among founders of the Action Party.

In 1942, at the age of sixteen, she was a student at the Liceo ginnasio statale Terenzio Mamiani. Through Lucio Lombardo Radice, Marisa joined the clandestine organization of the Italian Communist Party at the same time as her fellow student Adele Maria Jemolo, Lombardo Radice's future wife. She enrolled in the Faculty of Physics at the University of Rome.

=== Anti-fascist partisan ===
Quickly, she became active in the ranks of the anti-fascists and joined the Patriotic Action Groups (GAP), under the name of Rosa. At eighteen, she was the youngest partisan in the organization.

She participated in various battles against the German occupiers. Most notably on March 23 Rosa participated in the attack on the German Bozen police battalion in Via Rasella, covering the Capponi group.

Musu was captured by the police on April 7, together with Pasquale Balsamo and Ernesto Borghesi; fortunately the commissioners Antonio Colasurdo and De Longis, who were in connection with the CLN, make them pass for a gang of common robbers, causing them to be locked up in the Regina Coeli prison. She is sentenced to death by the Nazi war court as a common criminal. GAP member Guglielmo Blasi betrayed the prisoners and exposed the members, but before he revealed that she belonged to the GAP, Musu, pretending to be ill, had herself transferred to the Santo Spirito Hospital in Sassia, from where, at the end of May, she managed to escape. She eventually came out of hiding with the liberation of Rome.

=== Post liberation career ===
After the war, Musu continued her activities in the Italian Communist Party, working for many years with Enrico Berlinguer in the Italian Communist Youth Federation and was elected to the Central Committee of the Italian Communist Party. She became a journalist, working for the newspapers Paese Sera and L'Unità. She covered the events of the Prague Spring, later was a correspondent in Vietnam, Mozambique, Palestine and Latin America. Since 1976, at the initiative of Gianni Rodari, Musu established the "Democratic Coordination of Parents", which was engaged in the practice and promotion of anti-fascist, secular and democratic values in schools; headed this Coordination for several years, and soon became the chief editor of the monthly newspaper "Il giornale dei Genitori".

Musu was also a member of the executive committee of the National Association of Italian Partisans and was vice-president of the Rome branch of the Association, member of the National Council of Users, head of the Committee "Television for Youth", member of the Film Review Committee, vice-president of the World Federation of Democratic Youth, chairman of the Association of Italian Girls and a long-term adviser to the leadership of the Rome branch of the Italian Communist parties.
