= List of chiefs of the Polizia di Stato =

Chief of the Polizia di Stato
- Capo della Polizia di Stato
- Coat of arms of the Polizia di Stato
- Incumbent; Vittorio Pisani since 11 May 2023
- Ministry of the Interior; Polizia di Stato
- Reports to: The minister of the interior
- Seat: Rome, Italy
- Nominator: The minister of the interior
- Appointer: The president of Italy
- Formation: 16 May 1878
- First holder: Luigi Berti
- Deputy: Maria Luisa Pellizzari
- Website: Polizia di Stato website

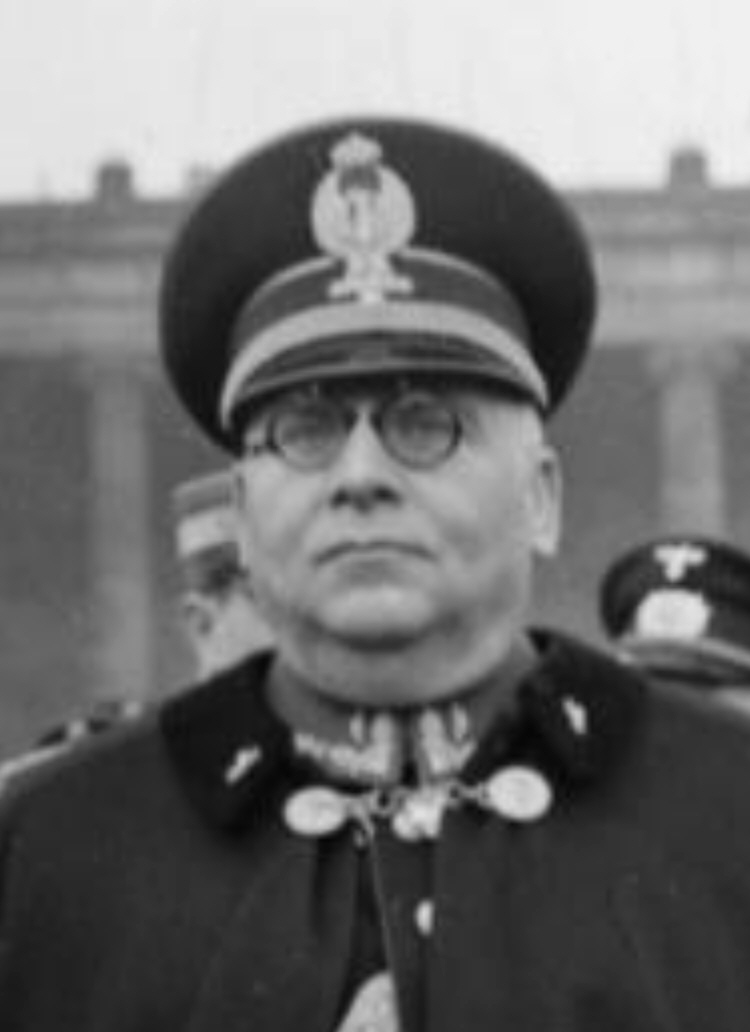
Arturo Bocchini, longest-serving Chief of the Polizia di Stato (1926–1940).

This article lists the chiefs of the Polizia di Stato, a law enforcement agency of Italy.

== List ==
No.	Name	Appointed	Dismissed	Notes
1	Luigi Berti	16 May 1878	16 December 1878	1st term.
2	Ferdinando Ramognini	16 January 1879	14 October 1879	1st term.
3	Giovanni Bolis	14 August 1879	31 December 1883	
4	Ottavio Lovera di Maria	31 December 1883	29 October 1885	
5	Bartolomeo Casalis	29 October 1885	16 April 1887	
6	Luigi Berti	10 July 1887	29 October 1890	2nd term.
7	Ferdinando Ramognini	1 December 1890	1 October 1893	2nd term.
8	Giuseppe Sensales	1 October 1893	7 April 1896	
9	Giovanni Alfazio	7 April 1896	1 August 1898	
10	Francesco Leonardi	1 August 1898	23 February 1911	
11	Giacomo Vigliani	1 February 1911	29 September 1917	1st term.
12	Giuseppe Sorge	29 September 1917	10 March 1919	
13	Riccardo Zoccoletti	10 March 1919	1 July 1919	
13	Vincenzo Quaranta	1 July 1919	19 June 1920	
14	Giacomo Vigliani	19 June 1920	14 July 1921	2nd term.
15	Corrado Bonfanti Linares	14 July 1921	1 March 1922	
16	Giacomo Vigliani	2 March 1922	7 August 1922	3rd term.
17	Raffaele Gasbarri	8 August 1922	11 November 1922	Served at the time of the Fascist March on Rome.
18	Emilio De Bono	11 November 1922	16 June 1924	Major general of the Royal Italian Army and one of the Fascist Quadrumvirs. Also served as Commandant–General of the Blackshirts.
19	Francesco Crispo Moncada	17 June 1924	13 September 1926	
20	Arturo Bocchini	13 September 1926	20 November 1940	Also headed OVRA, the Fascist secret police. Died in office.
21	Carmine Senise	20 November 1940	15 April 1943	1st term.
22	Lorenzo Chierici	16 April 1943	25 July 1943	General of the Blackshirts. Deposed during the fall of the Fascist regime.
23	Carmine Senise	26 July 1943	23 September 1943	2nd term.
24	Tullio Tamburini	1 October 1943	April 1944	Chief of the Republican Police Corps of the Italian Social Republic.
25	Eugenio Cerruti	April 1944	October 1944	Chief of the Republican Police Corps of the Italian Social Republic.
26	Renzo Montagna	6 October 1944	25 April 1945	Chief of the Republican Police Corps of the Italian Social Republic.
27	Giuseppe Solimena	15 April 1944	15 August 1944	
28	Luigi Ferrari	16 August 1944	12 September 1948	
29	Giovanni D'Antoni	12 September 1948	20 September 1952	
30	Tommaso Pavone	20 September 1952	11 March 1954	
31	Giovanni Carcaterra	22 March 1954	10 October 1960	
32	Angelo Vicari	10 October 1960	28 January 1973	
33	Efisio Zanda Loy	2 February 1973	4 June 1975	
34	Giorgio Menichini	5 June 1975	19 November 1976	
35	Giuseppe Parlato	20 November 1976	19 January 1979	
36	Giovanni Rinaldo Coronas	19 January 1979	27 April 1984	
37	Giuseppe Porpora	27 April 1984	22 January 1987	
38	Vincenzo Parisi	22 January 1987	27 August 1994	
39	Fernando Masone	27 August 1994	31 May 2000	
40	Gianni De Gennaro	1 June 2000	2 July 2007	
41	Antonio Manganelli	2 July 2007	20 March 2013	Died in office.
42	Alessandro Marangoni	20 March 2013	31 May 2013	Acting.
43	Alessandro Pansa	31 May 2013	29 April 2016	
44	Franco Gabrielli	29 April 2016	28 February 2021	
45	Maria Luisa Pellizzari	1 March 2021	4 March 2021	Acting.
46	Lamberto Giannini	4 March 2021	11 May 2023	
47	Vittorio Pisani	11 May 2023		

== See also ==
- Commander-General of the Carabinieri
  - List of commanding generals of the Carabinieri
