= Guido Leto =

Italian police official, head of OVRA

Head of the OVRA
- In office October 1938 – April 1945
- Preceded by: Arturo Bocchini
- Succeeded by: office abolished
- Deputy Chief of the Republican Police Corps
- In office October 1943 – April 1945

Personal details
- Born: 1895 Palermo, Kingdom of Italy
- Died: 1956 (age 61) Palermo, Italy

Guido Leto (Palermo, 1895 – 1956) was an Italian police official, head of the OVRA, the secret police of the Fascist regime, from 1938 to 1945. Throughout his career as a policeman he served under the Kingdom of Italy, the Italian Social Republic, and the Italian Republic.

== Biography ==
After graduating in law, Leto started his career as a civil servant in 1919, and from 1922 he worked for the Ministry of the Interior. From 1926 he began working with the chief of the police, Francesco Crispo Moncada. Immediately after Violet Gibson's attempted assassination of Benito Mussolini, he was tasked with gathering information in Dublin in order to find out if there had been international instigators behind the attack; after returning to Italy, Leto reported that Gibson was indeed suffering from mental problems and had acted on her own initiative.

After failing to prevent the assassination attempt on Mussolini by Gino Lucetti, Crispo Moncada was replaced as chief of the police by the prefect of Genoa, Arturo Bocchini, with whom Leto established a strong professional bond. Leto then joined the Special Subversive Movement Office (Ufficio speciale movimento sovversivo, established in 1925 and operational until 1930). He took part, together with Michelangelo Di Stefano, in the investigation on the attempted assassination of King Victor Emmanuel III in 1928, a bomb attack at the Milan Fair that had resulted in twenty deaths and forty wounded. The investigation led to the arrest of several members of the Justice and Freedom movement, including Umberto Ceva, who was accused to have prepared the bomb and who committed suicide in prison, Ernesto Rossi and Riccardo Bauer, who in 1931 were sentenced to twenty years' imprisonment by the Special Tribunal for the Defense of the State, although their responsibility in the attack was never proven.

Leto was appointed deputy questore in 1932, second class questore in 1936 and first class questore in 1938. In 1935 he was appointed head of the General and Confidential Affairs Division (Divisione Affari Generali e Riservati, DAGR), tasked with surveillance and repression of Communist activities. Because of his knowledge of foreign languages, he often had assignments abroad and relations with his counterparts in various countries. He was also a member of the US Police Chiefs Association and the International Criminal Police Commission.

In October 1938 he succeeded Michelangelo Di Stefano at the helm of the Political Police Division of the Ministry of the Interior, on Bocchini's appointment. After the beginning of the Second World War, on behalf of the chief of police, Leto arranged for the collection of information from the Quaestors on the feelings of the Italians towards the war.

After the fall of Fascism on 25 July 1943, Leto was granted protection by a family friend, anti-fascist Rosario Bentivegna, a former university classmate and friend of his son Disma, whom he had previously released from prison. Although he was among the targets chosen for assassination by the Roman GAP, Bentivegna successfully opposed this project.

Leto later joined the Italian Social Republic, becoming deputy chief of its police as well as resuming his duties as head of the OVRA, which after being abolished by the new Italian government in July 1943, had been re-established by the new Fascist state on 18 September 1943. In December 1943 he directed an operation in Rome, carried out by Erich Priebke and Pietro Koch, that resulted in the arrest of eighteen anti-Fascists, including Communist Giovanni Roveda. In March 1944 he moved to Valdagno, bringing with him a substantial part of the OVRA archive (6,000 boxes of documents) which was housed in the premises of the wool mill owned by industrialist Gaetano Marzotto. Following the collapse of the Italian Social Republic, Leto was temporarily confirmed by the Allied authorities as the curator and manager of the aforementioned archive (later transferred to Rome in the Viminale cellars); according to historian Giuseppe De Lutiis, when it arrived in Rome, the archive was ransacked in order to eliminate from the lists of informants the names of some people “who had managed to rebuild a democratic virginity”.

Leto, who returned to Rome in 1945, was arrested and imprisoned in Regina Coeli and subjected to an "epuration" commission. During his imprisonment in Regina Coeli, on 27 September 1945, he was taken to the home of Mario Spallone, a prison doctor and friend of Communist leader Palmiro Togliatti, and personally interrogated by Togliatti before being taken back to his cell. Two days later he was once again taken from his cell and taken to the home of Pietro Nenni, leader of the Italian Socialist Party, where he stayed for about an hour and a half. He was also interrogated by the Allied secret services for about ten days. On 12 April 1946 he was acquitted in the Court of Appeal from the charges brought against him; according to historian Mimmo Franzinelli, he exchanged his immunity for the destruction of documents that implicated members of anti-Fascist parties in collaboration with the regime.

In 1948 he was reinstated into service and was recalled by Federico Umberto D'Amato with the task of reactivating the Italian secret services. In 1951 ended his career in the police as Technical Director of Police Schools; in the same year he published a book about the OVRA, where he claimed that the name of the Fascist secret police was not an acronym and had no meaning, but had been chosen personally by Mussolini for its assonance with the word piovra (octopus), to indicate a tentacular police force that would keep the whole country under control; the Duce was convinced that the mysterious name of OVRA "... would have aroused curiosity, fear, a sense of elusive surveillance and omnipotence".

After his retirement from the police, Count Marzotto, whom he had met in Valdagno, appointed him director of his hotel chain, Jolly Hotel. He died in 1956.

Director Marco Leto was his son.
