= Carmine Senise =

Italian police officer

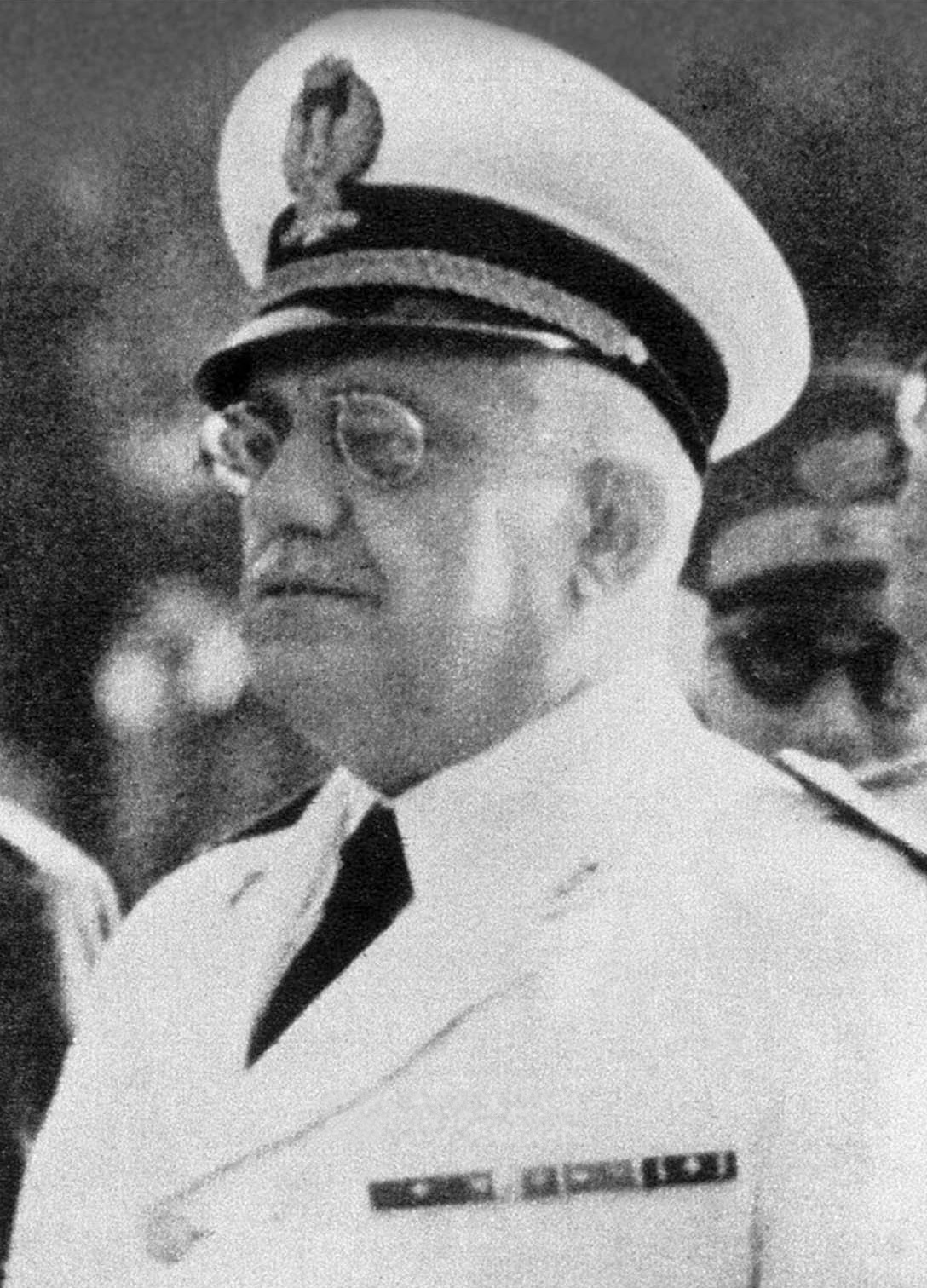

Chief of the Italian Police
- In office 20 November 1940 – 14 April 1943
- Preceded by: Arturo Bocchini
- Succeeded by: Lorenzo Chierici
- Chief of the Italian Police
- In office 26 July 1943 – 23 September 1943
- Preceded by: Lorenzo Chierici
- Succeeded by: Tullio Tamburini

Personal details
- Born: 28 November 1883 Naples, Kingdom of Italy
- Died: 24 January 1958 (aged 74) Rome, Italy
- Cause of death: Cerebral arteriosclerosis
- Citizenship: Italian citizenship

Carmine Senise (28 November 1883 in Naples – 24 January 1958 in Rome) was the chief of the Italian police from November 1940 to September 1943, except for a brief period from April to July 1943.

== Biography ==
He was born in 1883 in Naples from a family of Lucan origin, son of Tommaso Senise, physician and senator of the Kingdom of Italy; his uncle, who bore the same name, was prefect of Naples. After graduating in law, in 1908 Senise started working for the Ministry of the Interior; his first assignment was in the sub-prefecture of Pozzuoli.

From 1911 to 1922, he was secretary and later head of the press office of the Ministry of Interior. Subsequently, he was assigned to the General Directorate of Prisons and then to the Directorate of Health. In 1930, he was transferred to the General Directorate of Public Security and became head of the Division for General and Confidential Affairs. In 1932, he was promoted to prefect and appointed deputy chief of the police.

After the sudden death of police chief Arturo Bocchini on 22 November 1940, Senise was appointed his successor, on the proposal of Undersecretary of State Guido Buffarini Guidi, on the same day of Bocchini's death. He held this post for most of World War II, until on 14 April 1943, Benito Mussolini, displeased with his "weak" repression of the workers' strikes that had taken place in northern Italy in March, dismissed him, replacing him with MVSN General Lorenzo Chierici. Senise participated in the "conspiracy" of 25 July 1943, when the Grand Council of Fascism voted a motion of no confidence against Mussolini, resulting in his forced resignation; it was Senise who proposed to have Mussolini arrested in Villa Savoia, the private residence of King Victor Emmanuel III.

On 26 July 1943, Marshal of Italy Pietro Badoglio, the new head of the government, reinstated Senise in his position of Chief of the Police; after the Armistice of Cassibile and the start of Operation Achse, while the King, Badoglio and most of the government and military leaders fled to Brindisi, Senise remained at his post in Rome. On 23 September 1943, he was arrested by SS Captain Erich Priebke in his office at the Viminale Palace, and was then transferred to Nazi Germany and imprisoned in the Dachau concentration camp. From there he was later transferred to Hirschegg, being liberated on 2 May 1945.

After his return to Italy, Senise was accused of aiding and abetting Fascism, but was acquitted by the Special Court of Assize in Rome. In 1946, he published his memoirs, Quando ero Capo della polizia, 1940-1943, claiming he had tried to preserve the autonomy of the police with respect to the regime.

He died in 1958, at the age of seventy-four, in his modest home in a working-class neighborhood of Rome, from cerebral arteriosclerosis.
