= SS Police Regiment Bozen =

Nazi German police regiment

- SS-Polizeiregiment "Bozen"
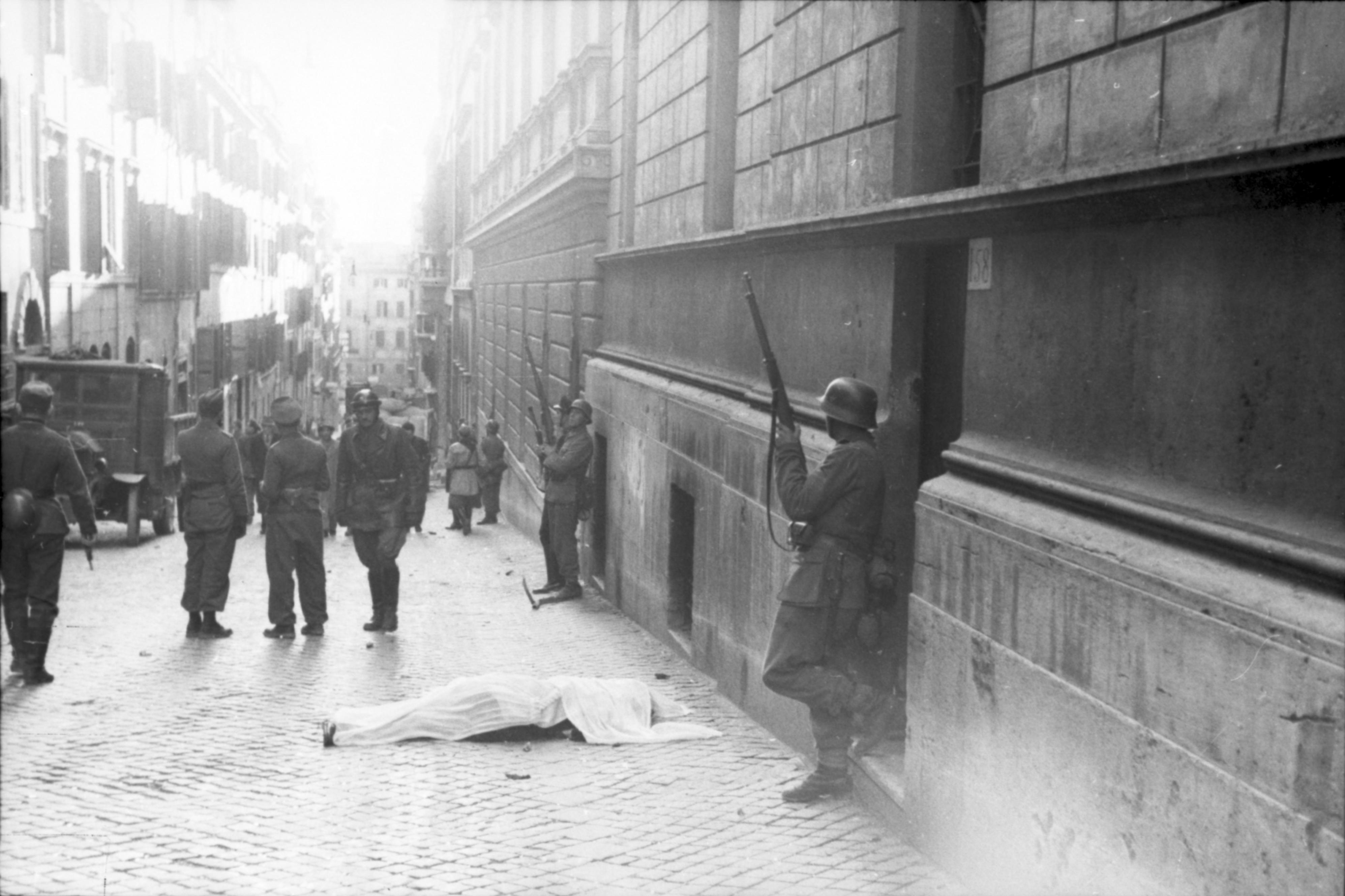
- Members of Polizeiregiment "Bozen" in Rome following the Via Rasella attack, 23 March 1944
- Active: 1943–1945
- Country: Nazi Germany
- Branch: Ordnungspolizei
- Type: Police regiment
- Role: Gendarmerie
- Size: est. 2000 (Fall 1943)
- Garrison/HQ: Gries-San Quirino, the Palazzo del Viminale

Polizeiregiment "Südtirol" (Police Regiment "South Tyrol"), later Bozen, and finally SS-Polizeiregiment "Bozen", was a military unit of the German Ordnungspolizei ("Order Police") recruited in the predominantly German and Ladin-speaking Alto Adige region in north-east Italy in late 1943, during the de facto German annexation of the region. The ranks were South Tyrolean draftees while officers and NCOs were Germans.

The regiment's first and second battalions were active in Istria and Belluno respectively, while the third battalion was a reserve unit stationed in Rome. All three surrendered to Allied or partisan forces in the last days of the war. On 23 March 1944 the 11th company of its 3rd battalion was the target of the Via Rasella attack in Rome, that led to the bloody German retaliation known as the Ardeatine massacre.

== Background ==
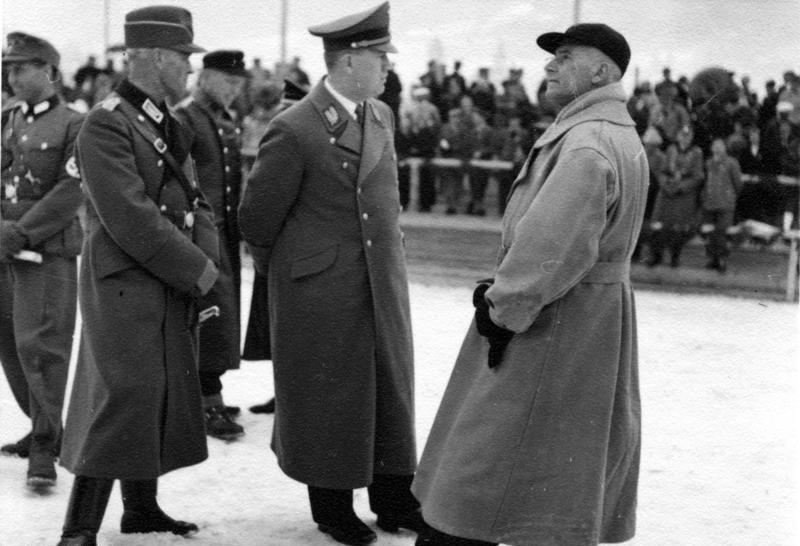
Franz Hofer (center) meeting with Wilhelm Frick (right), Reich Minister of the Interior in February 1939

Following the Badoglio Proclamation on 8 September 1943, the announcement of the Armistice of Cassibile, Germany invaded Italy. Two days later, South Tyrol, Trentino and Belluno came under German control as the Operational Zone of the Alpine Foothills (Operationszone Alpenvorland, OZAV). This region formally existed under the Italian Social Republic, but was de facto ruled by Franz Hofer, the Gauleiter of Tyrol-Vorarlberg.

The Central Recruitment Office was set up in South Tyrol by the Wehrmacht and Waffen-SS to form military units from residents of the OZAV. German authorities were at first limited to "Optanten," Tyroleans who had opted for German citizenship, but poor recruiting prompted Hofer to begin conscription in the region on 30 November 1943. All men born in 1924 and 1925 were drafted into the Todt Organization, Südtiroler Ordnungsdienst (SOD), Trento Security Corps (CST), Ordnungspolizei, or into the Wehrmacht or Waffen-SS. A following ordinance on 7 January 1944 widened the draft pool to all men born between 1894 and 1926, regardless of nationality. Dableiber, Tyroleans who had opted for Italian citizenship, were accused of treason and harassed. Many were sent to the Eastern Front. Draft evasion incurred a death sentence and persecution of relatives, according to the Nazi doctrine of Sippenhaft.

The forced recruitment of the Dableiber and the harsh punishment dolled out against draft evaders, as was the case for Franz Thaler, violated Articles 44, 45, and 46 of the Hague Convention of 1899 to which Germany was a signatory.

== Formation ==
Polizeiregiment "Südtirol" was formed in October 1943 under the command of Oberst Alois Menschick. By the end of the month the regiment, now called Polizeiregiment "Bozen", (Note: There is debate on when Polizeiregiment "Südtirol" changed its name. Historian Michael Wedekind gives 29 October 1943, while other sources claim the change took place in November.) had over 2000 soldiers in four battalions, each composed of four, later three, numbered battalions (I, II, III). Its members were trained for three months in the use of their weapons, camouflage, squad combat, and counter-guerrilla warfare. They were sworn into the Wehrmacht on 30 January in the presence of Karl Wolff and Karl Tinzl, then were assigned to the front.

== First battalion ==
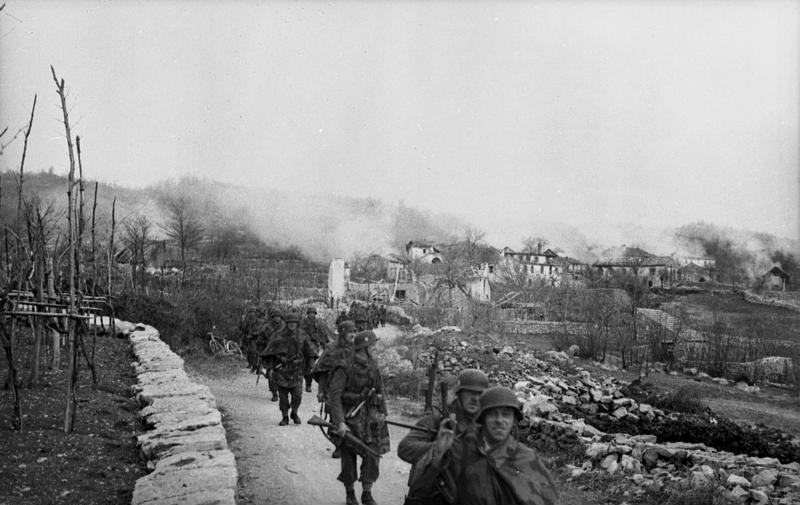
Soldiers of I Battalion march away from the burning village of Gornji Turki, near Kastav, Croatia, 5 April 1944. They were using Italian rifles and equipment.

I Battalion, composed of 900 men under the command of Major Oskar Kretschmer, was sent to Istria, then in the Operational Zone of the Adriatic Littoral (Operationszone Adriatisches Küstenland, OZAK), in February 1944. Based out of Opatija and under the direct command of the Ordnungspolizei commander in Trieste, Oberstleutnant Hermann Kintrup and indirectly commanded by the commander of the Waffen-SS in OZAK, Odilo Globocnik, was tasked with combating partisans and securing transportation routes from Trieste to Ljubljana. I Battalion was the only fully motorized battalion in the regiment, possessing an AB 41 and a Lancia 1ZM, both armored cars, and a single L3/33 and L3/35 tankette, all captured from the Italians after 8 September 1943.

On 5 April 1944, I Battalion embarked on Operation Bozen in the area of Brnčići, near Kastav, resulting in the razing of the village of Gornji Turki. The battalion then participated in Operation Braunschweig. On 30 April, German troops of the 278th Infantry and 188th Reserve Mountain Divisions, and the 24th Waffen-SS Karstjäger, razed the village of Lipa and killed its 263 inhabitants. Croatian researcher Petra Predoević found that some testimonies and archival data implicated the Bozen Regiment, whose attack by Yugoslav partisans had been the cause of the Lipa massacre. On 3 May, the 3rd Company was assigned to Cacitti (between Divača and Hrpelje-Kozina), while the 2nd Company was deployed to Šušnjevica as a Sicherungsgruppe (security group) to cut off partisan withdrawal from the area.

As Axis forces withdrew from the Balkans, I Battalion was stationed at Ajdovščina, then in Tolmin. Finally, in an attempt to impede the British 8th Army, the battalion was sent to the Predil Pass, near the modern Italian-Slovene border. The battalion surrendered to the 8th Army at Thörl-Maglern, Carinthia in May 1945 after a lengthy retreat. In Allied custody, the battalion was sent to a camp at Kötschach-Mauthen, from which some of its members escaped by to the South Tyrol through the Gailtal. The prisoners were first transferred to Udine, then to Bellaria – Igea Marina and were guarded with greater attention by New Zealand and Polish soldiers. The escapees from Kötschach-Mauthen that made it home were required to appear at the "Vittorio-Veneto" barracks in Bolzano, arrested, put under surveillance, and transferred to Rimini and then to Taranto. All prisoners were released in September 1946.

== Second battalion ==
II Battalion was sent to province of Belluno in February 1944 where, between March and December, it participated in 85 anti-partisan actions. The most prominent of these were in the Biois valley in August and the Monte Grappa in September. From 20 August and into 21 August, contingents of II Battalion under Zugwachtmeister Erwin Fritz, 1st Fallschirm-Panzer Division Hermann Göring, and the SS-Mountain-Combat-School SS-Gebirgs-Kampfschule at Predazzo were involved in the Biois valley massacre. As a result of their actions, 44 civilians were killed and another 645 made homeless by the destruction of 245 homes. In March 1945, II Battalion hung 14 civilians in Belluno's central square for the killing of three soldiers by partisans. South Tyrolean historian Leopold Steurer noted that the battalion, and the Bozen Regiment by extension, became infamous for its brutality in Belluno.

Most of II Battalion was taken prisoner by partisans at Agordo on 2 May 1945. Battalion members who had attempted escape through the Agordino were re-apprehended and held a camp at Cencenighe Agordino, that were participants in the Biois valley massacre were shot on recognition. The remaining prisoners were handed over to the Americans and joined I Battalion at Rimini. Like I Battalion, II Battalion was released from prison in September 1946.

Participants of the Biois valley massacre were tried in 1979, but acquitted on lack of evidence. When called to testify, they condemned the behavior of their former commanders. Erwin Fritz, then a resident of Göttingen, West Germany and a retired police commissioner, was tried in absentia because his extradition was refused. Fritz's defense was given to Roland Riz, the vice-president of the South Tyrolean People's Party, who requested an acquittal. Fritz was initially sentenced with life imprisonment by the Corte d'Assise of Bologna, which was rescinded by an appeal that found the sentence impotent by lack of jurisdiction. Fritz was again tried in 1988, by the Military Tribunal of Verona, but acquitted based on lack of evidence.

== Third battalion ==
III Battalion was transferred to Rome over seven days, from 12 February to 19 February 1944, likely as an agreement between Hofer and Wolff. The transfer was carried out with great difficulty because of ongoing battles at Monte Cassino and at Anzio. Theoretically, III Battalion was under the command of Wolff, but was de facto commanded by Luftwaffe General Kurt Mälzer. After being captured, Wolff stated that III Battalion had been made available to Albert Kesselring upon his request to conduct police duties in Rome and to protect the Vatican. Previously, this had been carried out by the 2nd Fallschirmjäger Division.

The battalion, reduced to three companies, was housed in the attic of the Palazzo del Viminale, which had housed the Italian Ministry of the Interior before its transfer to Toscolano-Maderno. 9th Company supervised the construction of defensive works at Albano Laziale, 10th Company guarded the Vatican and public buildings, and 11th Company was a reserve. For rotation, the 11th would relieve the 10th on 24 March 1944.

Members of III Battalion, some of whom were Ladins and spoke German poorly, did not receive leave and were forbidden from interacting with Romans or attending church. The native German officers routinely insulted their charges during training, and nicknamed them the "Tyrolean blockheads" (Tiroler Holzköpfer).

== Relationship with the Schutzstaffel ==
In historiography since the Via Rasella attack, the third battalion of the Bozen Regiment was often erroneously identified as a Waffen-SS volunteer detachment. Italian historian Lorenzo Baratter, author of several works on the South Tyrolean police regiments, noted the frequency and repetition of this error. American journalist Robert Katz erroneously supported the idea of the battalion being part of the Waffen-SS in his work on the attack, Death in Rome. In it, he cites notes taken during an interview with ex-partisan Mario Fiorentini on 27 March 1965 stating that the men of the battalion wore SS markings on their uniform, while as part of the Ordnungspolizei all servicemen in the regiment wore standard German police green uniforms and insignia. Explanation for "SS markings on their uniform": The "Optanten" recruited for the German police were led by experienced police personnel who came from the German "Reich". The leading personnel of the police were often also members of the A-SS, which they could show in their uniforms by small SS runes below the left breast pocket.

== Sources ==
=== Secondary sources ===
- Andrae, Friedrich (1997). La Wehrmacht in Italia. La guerra delle forze armate tedesche contro la popolazione civile 1943-1945 (in Italian). Editori Riuniti. ISBN 88-359-4233-0.
- Baratter, Lorenzo (2003). Dall'Alpenvorland a Via Rasella. Storia dei reggimenti di polizia sudtirolesi (1943-1945) (in Italian). Publilux.
- Baratter, Lorenzo (2005). Le Dolomiti del Terzo Reich (in Italian). Mursia. ISBN 88-425-3463-3.
- Bentivegna, Rosario (2006). Via Rasella. La storia mistificata. Carteggio con Bruno Vespa (in Italian). Manifesto Libri. ISBN 88-7285-447-4.
- Benzoni, Alberto; Benzoni, Elisa (1999). Attentato e rappresaglia. Il PCI e via Rasella (in Italian). Marsilio. ISBN 88-317-7169-8.
- Di Giusto, Stefano (2005). Operationszone Adriatisches Künstenland. Udine, Gorizia, Trieste, Pola, Fiume e Lubiana durante l'occupazione tedesca 1943-1945 (in Italian). Istituto friulano per la storia del movimento di liberazione.
- Fry, Helen (2017). The London Cage: The Secret History of Britain's World War II Interrogation. Yale University Press. ISBN 9780300221930.
- Katz, Robert (1968) [1967]. Death in Rome. Pyramid Books. ASIN B0007ET5HI.
- Katz, Robert (2009) [2003]. Roma città aperta. Settembre 1943 - Giugno 1944 (in Italian). Il Saggiatore. ISBN 978-88-565-0047-9.
- Klanjšček, Zdravko (1984). Narodnooslobodilački Rat u Sloveniji 1941-1945 (in Croatian). Vojnoistorijski institut.
- Klinkhammer, Lutz (1997). Stragi naziste in Italia. La guerra contro i civili (1943-44) (in Italian). Donzelli Editore. ISBN 88-7989-339-4.
- Lepre, Aurelio (1996). Via Rasella. Leggenda e realtà della Resistenza a Roma (in Italian). Editori Laterza. ISBN 88-420-5026-1.
- Portelli, Alessandro (2012) [1999]. L'ordine è già stato eseguito. Roma, le Fosse Ardeatine, la memoria (in Italian). Feltrinelli. ISBN 978-88-07-723421.
- Prauser, Steffan (April 2002). "Mord in Rom? Der Anschlag in der Via Rasella und die deutsche Vergeltung in den Fosse Ardeatine im März 1944" (PDF). Vierteljahrshefte für Zeitgeschichte (in German). 50 (2). ISSN 0042-5702.
- Predoević, Petra (2007). "Operacija Braunschweig". Klepsidra (in Croatian). University of Rijeka.
- Raiber, Richard (2008) [2001]. Anatomy of Perjury. Field Marshal Albert Kesselring, Via Rasella, and the GINNY Mission. University of Delaware Press. ISBN 978-0-87413-994-5.
- Staron, Joachim (2007) [2002]. Fosse Ardeatine e Marzabotto. Storia e memoria di due stragi tedesche (in Italian). Il Mulino. ISBN 978-88-15-11518-8.
- Steinacher, Gerald (2012). "Das Massaker der Fosse Ardeatine und die Täterverfolgung. Deutsch-italienische Störfalle von Kappler bis Priebke". Faculty Publications, Department of History, University of Nebraska-Lincoln (in German). Böhlau Verlag. ISBN 978-3-205-78545-3.
- Vespa, Bruno (2008). Vincitori e vinti. Le stagioni dell'odio. Dalle leggi razziali a Prodi e Berlusconi (in Italian). Mondadori. ISBN 978-88-04-57469-9.
- Wedekind, Michael (2003). Nationalsozialistische Besatzungs- und Annexionspolitik in Norditalien 1943 bis 1945. Die Operationszonen "Alpenvorland" und "Adriatisches Küstenland" (in German). Oldenbourg Verlag. ISBN 3-486-56650-4.
- Williamson, Gordon (2002). German Security and Police Soldier 1939-45. Osprey. ISBN 1-84176-416-7.
- Williamson, Gordon (2006). World War II German Police Units. Osprey. ISBN 978-1-84603-068-0.
- Zanette, Michele (2011). "L'Alto Adige di Hitler. Collaborazione e resistenza durante l'occupazione nazista dell'Alto Adige 1943 - 1945". Anno Accademico (in Italian). University of Trento.

=== News sources ===
- Gandini, Umberto (1979). "Quelli di via Rasella. La storia dei sudtirolesi che subirono l'attentato del 23 marzo 1944 a Roma". Alto Adige (in Italian).
- Franceschini, Christoph (14 March 1994). "Das Trauma von Rom". Südtirol Profil (in German).
- Tessandori, Vicenzo (16 February 1978). "La strage dei nazisti a Falcade nel Bellunese". La Stampa (in Italian).
- "Criticata a Bolzano condanna a due nazisti". La Stampa (in Italian). 10 July 1979.
- "Caviola, 63 anni fa la strage". Corriere delle Alpi. 18 August 2007.

=== Memoirs ===
- Amendola, Giorgio (1973). Lettere a Milano. Ricordi e documenti 1939-1945 (in Italian). Editori Riuniti.
- Bentivegna, Rosario (2004) [1983]. Achtung Banditen! Prima e dopo via Rasella (in Italian). Mursia. ISBN 88-425-3218-5.
- Calamandrei, Franco (1984). La vita indivisibile. Diario 1941-1947 (in Italian). Editori Riuniti.
- Capponi, Carla (2009) [2000]. Con cuore di donna. Il Ventennio, la Resistenza a Roma, via Rasella: i ricordi di una protagonista (in Italian). Il Saggiatore. ISBN 978-88-565-0124-7.
- Trabucco, Carlo (1945). La prigionia di Roma. Diario dei 268 giorni dell'occupazione tedesca (in Italian). Editrice S.E.L.I.
