= Rosario Bentivegna =

Italian partisan

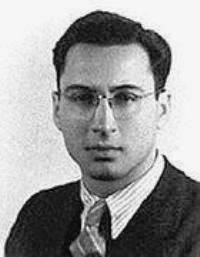
- Born: June 22, 1922; Rome, Kingdom of Italy
- Died: April 2, 2012 (aged 89); Rome, Italian Republic
- Military career
- Allegiance: Italy
- Branch: Patriotic Action Groups
- Service years: Sept. 1943 – May 1945
- Nickname: Paolo
- Units: 4th Brigade, Italian partisan "Garibaldi" division
- Conflicts: World War II: Roman resistance; Via Rasella attack; Yugoslav resistance

Rosario Bentivegna (22 June 1922 – 2 April 2012) was an Italian partisan and doctor. During the Second World War, while studying medicine at university, Bentivegna joined the Italian Communist Party and became an active member of the guerilla groups organized by the Roman resistance following the occupation of Italy by Nazi Germany. Under the codename "Paolo", he was one of the principle actors of the Via Rasella attack that killed 32 soldiers of the SS Police Regiment Bozen. After the war, Bentivegna remained a member of the Communist Party and married fellow Italian partisan Carla Capponi, who together promoted their party and the actions of the Italian resistance movement.

== Political and partisan activities ==
According to his own memoirs, Bentivegna became an anti-fascist in 1937 following the introduction of anti-Semitic propaganda and racist legislation in Italy. Bentivegna co-founded the Trotskyist Group for Marxist Unification (GUM, Gruppo di Unificazione Marxista) in 1939 with Corrado Nourian and Nino Baldini. While enrolled at the Sapienza University of Rome for his medical studies, however, he was a member of the Fascist University Groups (GUFs).

On 23 June 1941, Bentivegna participated in a demonstration of some three to four thousand other university students against the repeal of legislation preventing students in good academic standing from being drafted into the military. His ideology and participation in the demonstrations brought him to the attention of the Italian secret police, who arrested him. Bentivenga was released in 1943, albeit with a warning from the police, by the intercession of a friend, the son of Guido Leto, the head of the secret police. That same year, Bentivegna joined the Italian Communist Party, but as a result of his Trotskyist leanings and relationship with Leto, he was not trusted by the Party leadership.

== See also ==
- Carla Capponi
