= List of prefects of the province of Pola =

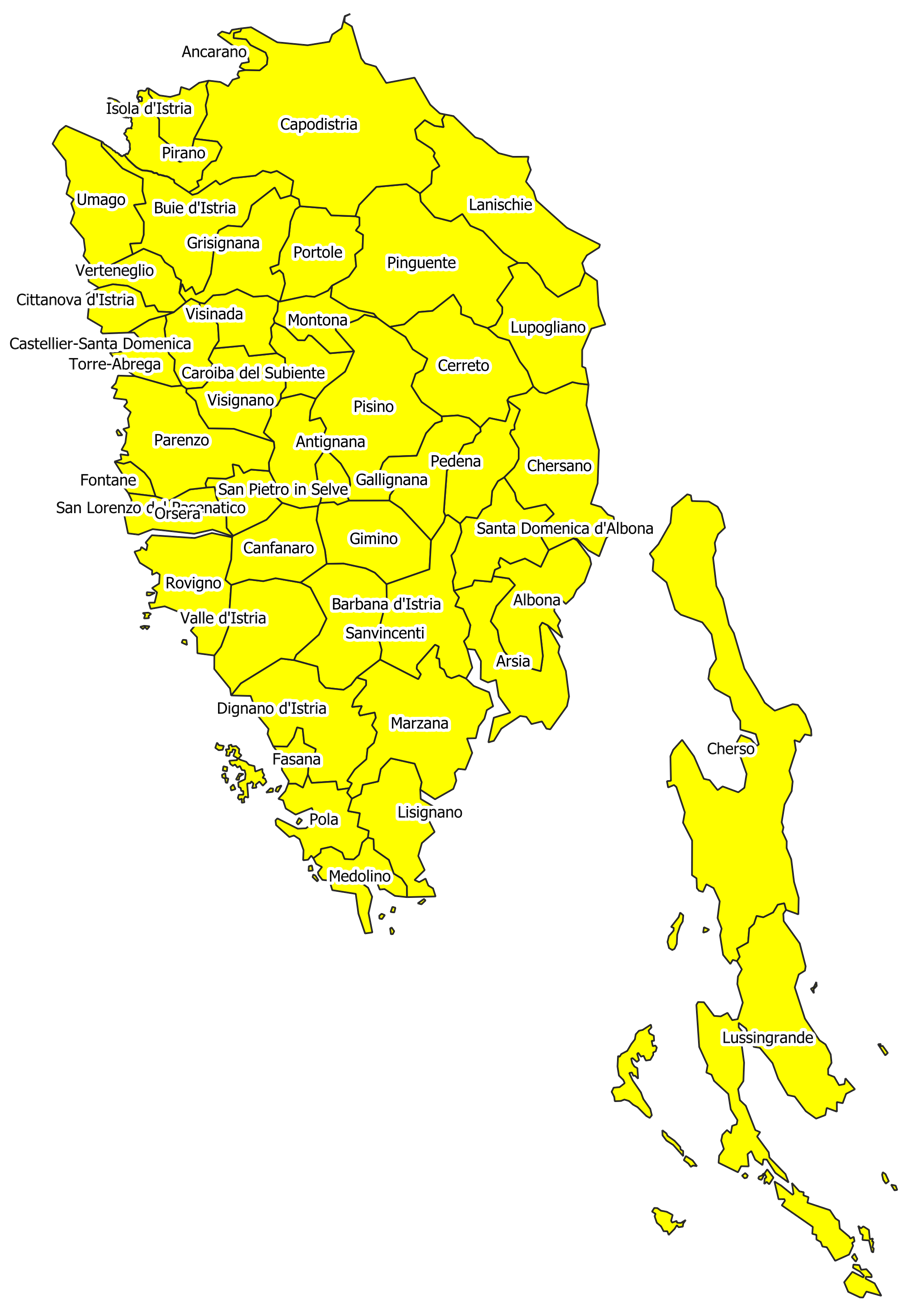
Province of Pola from 1923 to 1945

This is a list of prefects of the province of Pola (which consisted mostly of modern Istria County, in Croatia).

== List ==
(Dates in italics indicate de facto continuation of office)

Tenure	Portrait	Incumbent	Notes
Italian suzerainty
8 February 1923 to 10 January 1925		Alberto Giannoni, Prefect	
10 January 1925 to 16 October 1926		Anselmo Cassini, Prefect	
16 October 1926 to 1 April 1928		Enrico Cavalieri, Prefect	
1 April 1928 to 16 May 1931		Leone Leone, Prefect	
16 May 1931 to 10 September 1933		Italo Foschi, Prefect	
10 September 1933 to 21 August 1939		Oreste Cimoroni, Prefect	
21 August 1939 to 5 December 1941		Lorenzo Chierici, Prefect	
5 December 1941 to 8 September 1943		Vincenzo Berti, Prefect	Deposed by the Wehrmacht, in the aftermath of the Armistice of Cassibile
German occupation
8 September 1943 to 18 October 1943		Emanuele Zannelli, Prefect	Appointed on behalf of the Italian Social Republic
18 October 1943 to 25 April 1945		Ludovico Artusi, Head of the province	Appointed on behalf of the Italian Social Republic
10 September 1943 to 7 May 1945		Friedrich Rainer, High Commissioner of the Operational Zone of the Adriatic Littoral	

== See also ==
- Istria
- History of Istria
- Istrian Italians
