= Carlo Salinari =

Italian journalist, critic, politician and writer

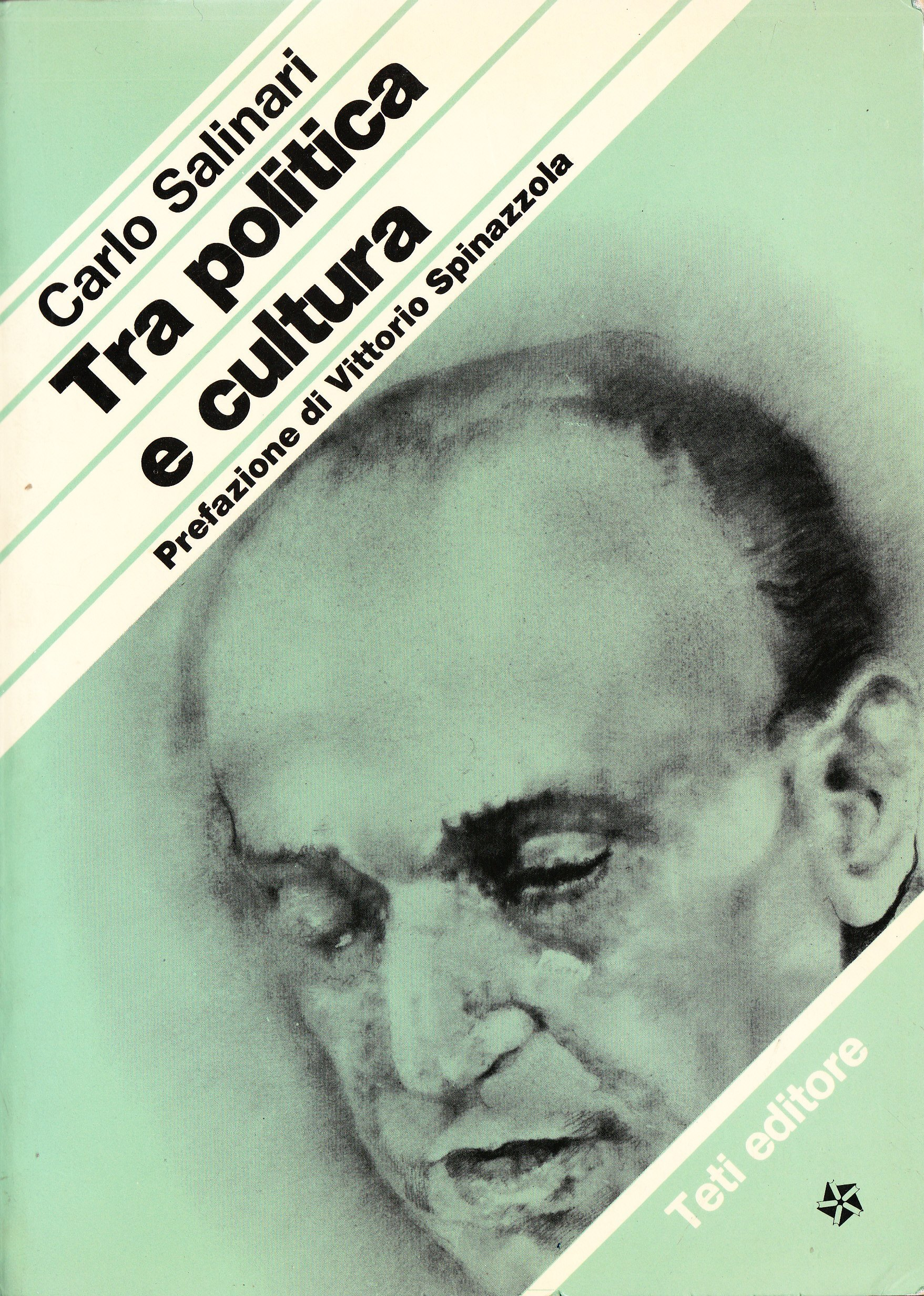
Cover of Between politics and culture by Carlo Salinari

Carlo Salinari (November 17, 1919 – May 25, 1977) was an Italian literary critic and academic.

== Career ==
Salinari graduated in literature at the University of Rome in 1941. A member of the Italian Communist Party, he was an active participant in the Patriotic Action Groups. He was one of the organizers of the Via Rasella attack in March 1944.

He was arrested by Italian fascists in April 1944 and handed to the German occupiers. He remained a prisoner of the Germans until the liberation of Rome.

Salinari taught at the universities of Palermo, Cagliari, Milan, Salerno and Rome where he chaired the Faculty of Letters in 1977. He was responsible for the Cultural Section of the Communist Party. In 1954 he founded with the magazine Il Contemporaneo with Antonello Trombadori which promoted Marxist aesthetics.

He was a convinced defender of neorealism and wrote numerous articles and essays on this theme which were partially collected in 1960 in the volumes La questione del realismo (The question of neorealism) and, in 1967, in Preludio e fine del realismo in Italia (Prelude and End of Neorealism in Italy).

He studied decadentism and completed several studies on Gabriele D'Annunzio, Giovanni Pascoli, Antonio Fogazzaro and Luigi Pirandello. Among his many works are remembered Miti e coscienza del decadentismo italiano (Myths and consciousness of Italian decadentism, 1960), Storia popolare della letteratura italiana (Popular history of Italian literature, 1962), as well as his commentary on Boccaccio's Decameron (1963).

He was director of the magazine Il Calendario del Popolo from 1966 until his death in 1977.

== Awards ==
Two Silver Medals of Military Valor
