= Il calendario del popolo =

Il Calendario del Popolo is a cultural and political magazine published in Italy since 1945.

== History and profile ==
Il calendario del popolo was founded in March 1945 in Rome by the intellectual and theatre critic Giulio Trevisani. Issued monthly during 65 years, it is a quarterly publication since 2010. The editors in chief have been prominent personalities of Italian culture like Carlo Salinari - literary critic and partisan in Rome - and Franco Della Peruta, historian. The magazine, supported by very active subscribers, acculturated the proletarian masses of the Italian post-war society, promoting several cultural initiatives and events like the Prize for dialect poetry "Premio Cattolica - Il Calendario del Popolo" which in 1950 - at its first edition - awarded the still unknown young writers and poets Pier Paolo Pasolini and Tonino Guerra.

Since 1964, the publisher has been Nicola Teti owner and founder of the Milan based publishing house "Teti Editore". Currently the publisher is "Sandro Teti Editore" publishing house, based in Rome.

== See also ==
- List of magazines in Italy
