= Stefanina Moro =

Italian partisan (1927–1944)

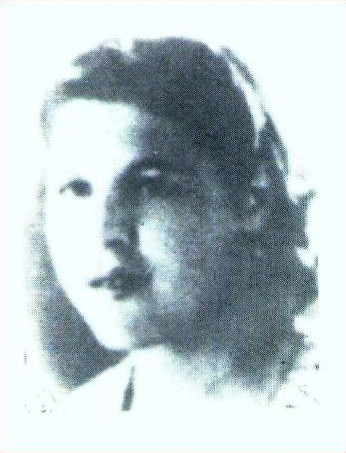
- Born: 1927; Genoa, Italy
- Died: October 9, 1944 (aged 16–17); Asti, Italy
- Burial place: Genoa
- Monuments: Via Stefanina Moro in Genoa
- Occupations: Courier, Italian resistance movement

Stefanina Moro (1927 – October 9, 1944) was an Italian partisan during the occupation of her country by the forces of Nazi Germany. Serving as a courier, she was captured by Nazi forces. Tortured by them for information, she died from her injuries.

== Life ==
Born in Genoa, she lived in the Quezzi district. During the war of Italian liberation, she served as a staffetta, or courier, responsible for maintaining communications between groups of partisans. In 1944, still a teenager, she was arrested by Nazi forces. She was taken, first to the Casa del Fascio in Cornigliano, and then the Casa dello Studente in Corso Gastaldi. The latter was a former university building occupied by the Nazis and turned into a prison. There, tortures were conducted under the command of SS officer Friedrich Engel, who would come to be known as the "Executioner of Genoa". Moro was tortured in an attempt to force her to reveal the names of her allies, but these attempts were unsuccessful. Afterwards, she was hospitalized in Asti, where she died on October 9 as a result of her injuries.

== Legacy ==
Her name was inscribed on a memorial to those from Quezzi who died opposing the Nazi occupation, the dedication of which reads: "Non caddero invano ma per la libertà. Il Comitato di Liberazione Nazionale Liguria agli eroici caduti del rione di Quezzi". ("They did not fall in vain but for freedom. The National Liberation Committee of Liguria to the heroic fallen of the Quezzi district"). Additionally, the city of Genoa named a street, the Via Stefanina Moro, in her honor, with a plaque reading "Via Stefanina Moro – Caduta per la libertà – 1927–9/10/1944".

In April 2020, on the occasion of the 75th Anniversary of Italy's Liberation, Sandra Zampa, the Undersecretary at the Ministry of Health for the Conte administration, gave an address honoring the women of the Resistance, naming Stefanina Moro alongside other partisans such as Nilde Iotti and Irma Bandiera.
