= Arturo Bocchini =

Italian civil servant

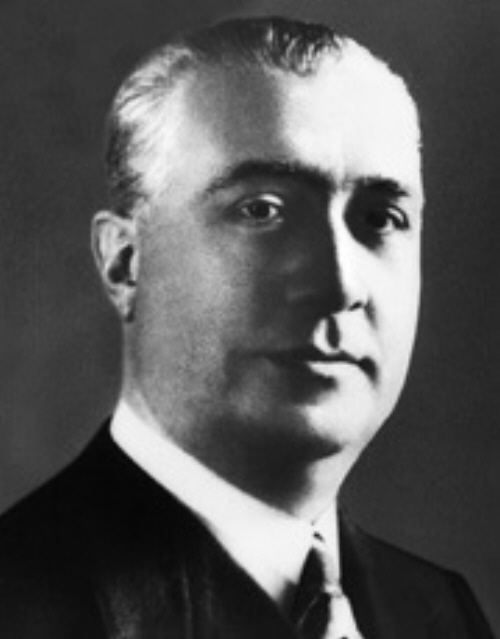

Chief of the Italian Police
- In office 13 September 1926 – 20 November 1940
- Monarch: Victor Emmanuel III
- Prime Minister: Benito Mussolini
- Preceded by: Francesco Crispo Moncada
- Succeeded by: Carmine Senise

Member of the Senate of the Kingdom
- In office 16 November 1933 – 20 November 1940
- Appointed by: Victor Emmanuel III

Personal details
- Born: February 12, 1880 San Giorgio La Montagna, Campania, Kingdom of Italy
- Died: November 20, 1940 (aged 60) Rome, Lazio, Kingdom of Italy
- Party: National Fascist Party
- Occupation: Civil servant

Arturo Bocchini (Italian pronunciation: [arˈtuːro bokˈkiːni]; 12 February 1880 – 20 November 1940) was an Italian civil servant, who was appointed Chief of the Police under the Fascist regime of Benito Mussolini. Bocchini held the office from September 1926 until his death in November 1940, becoming a key figure in the Italian regime.

He was the head of both the regular police (State Police) and the secret police (OVRA) which was a pervasive national security agency that operated at all levels of Italian society. Bocchini only reported directly to the Duce and operated autonomously without interference from the National Fascist Party and the state prefects. His power within the government led to him being called the "Vice Duce".

== Early life ==
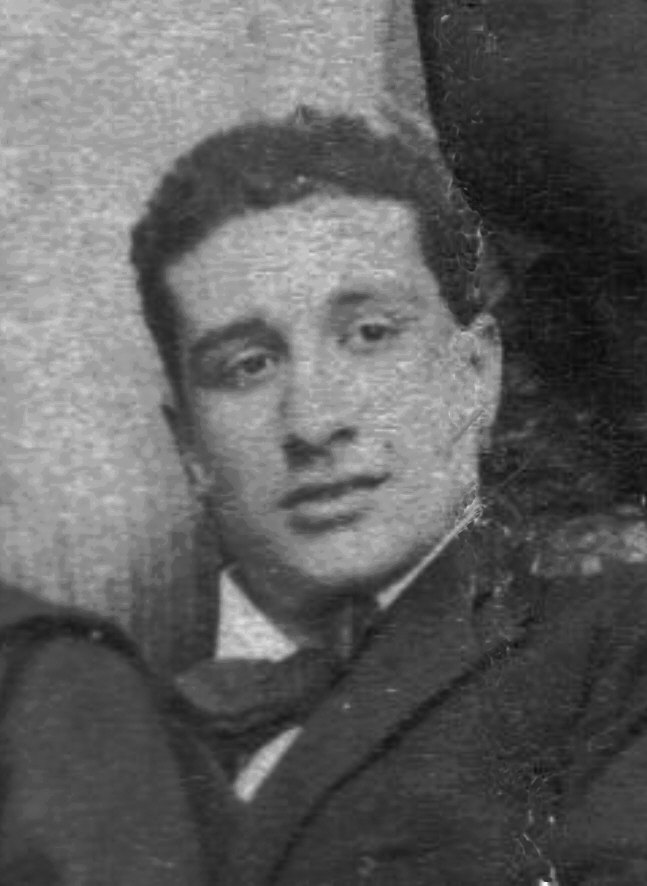
Bocchini in his youth

Bocchini was the last of the seven children born in San Giorgio La Montagna, near Benevento to Ciriaco Bocchini, a wealthy landowner, and his mother was Concetta Padiglione, a member of the aristocratic but liberal Padiglione family. After Bocchini graduated with a Law degree from the Federico II University in Naples in 1902, he joined the prefectural civil service. After Mussolini took power in 1922, Bocchini was appointed by Deputy Minister Aldo Finzi as the Prefect of Brescia (1922–1923), then Bologna (1923–1925), and finally Genoa (1925–1926).

== National Chief of Police ==
In 1926 Mussolini, on the advice of Luigi Federzoni (who knew him from Bologna), made Bocchini Rome's Chief of Police and de facto head of all civil law enforcement in Fascist Italy. Bocchini had control over the regular Polizia di Stato and the OVRA, the political police of the National Fascist Party. Despite his political attempts, the Carabinieri, the national Gendarmerie of Italy, remained under the control of the Royal Italian Army.

Mussolini entrusted him with the job of maintaining order in Italy. To achieve this, Bocchini was granted maximum political coverage, complete freedom of action and the privilege of reporting directly to Mussolini.

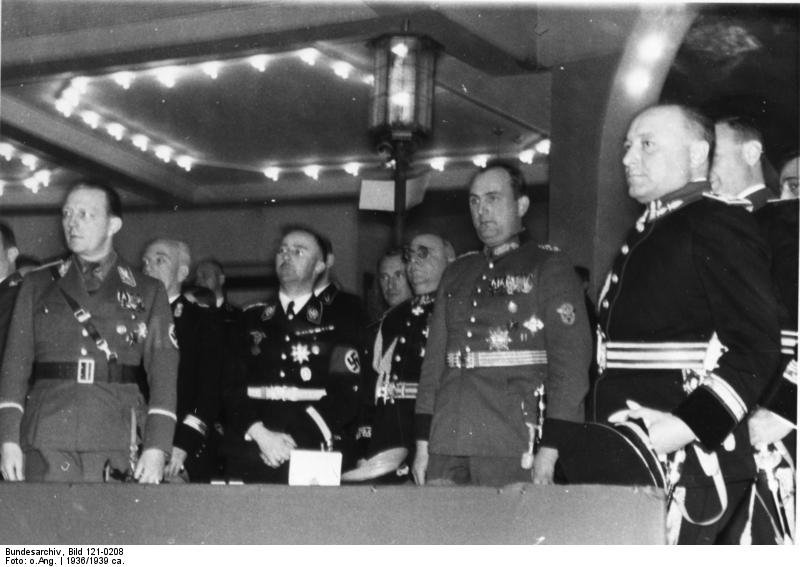
Bocchini (third from the left) stands between Reichsführer-SS Heinrich Himmler and chief of the Ordnungspolizei, Kurt Daluege, during an official visit to Berlin in 1936.

As Rome's Chief of Police, Bocchini oversaw the arrest and brutal treatment of many prominent anti-fascists, such as Antonio Gramsci, who died in April 1937, aged 45.

His position of power within the fascist regime was strengthened by his close relationship with his German counterpart Reichsführer-SS Heinrich Himmler. In two official visits, to Germany in 1936 and in 1938 to Italy, Bocchini and Himmler met to coordinate how the OVRA and the Nazis' Gestapo and Sicherheitsdienst could work internationally to share and gather intelligence and arrest political/ideological enemies.

== Death ==
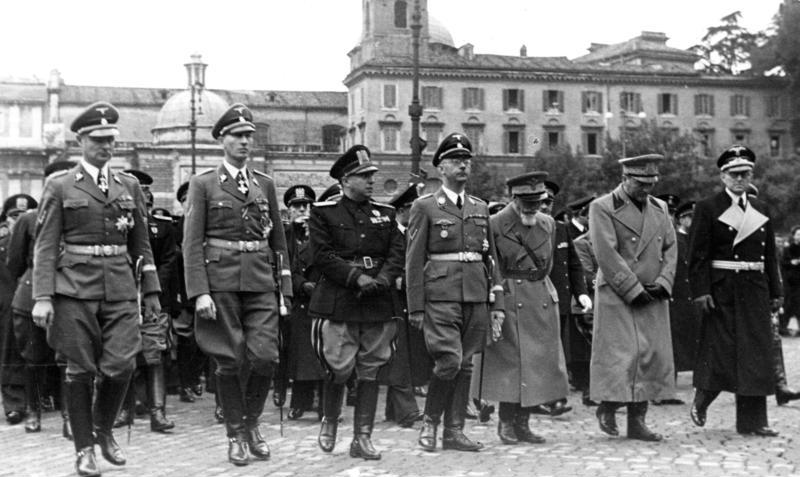
Italian state officials attending Bocchini's funeral with Nazi dignitaries in Rome on 21 November 1940.

Bocchini died of a stroke in Rome in November 1940. His funeral was attended by notable leaders from Nazi Germany's police and security agencies such as Reichsführer-SS Heinrich Himmler, SS-Obergruppenführer Karl Wolff, and chief of the RSHA, SS-Obergruppenführer und General der Polizei Reinhard Heydrich.
