= Via Rasella attack =

1944 action taken by the Italian resistance movement against Nazi Germany

Coordinates: 41.9027340°N 12.4890040°E

- Part of the Italian campaign of World War II
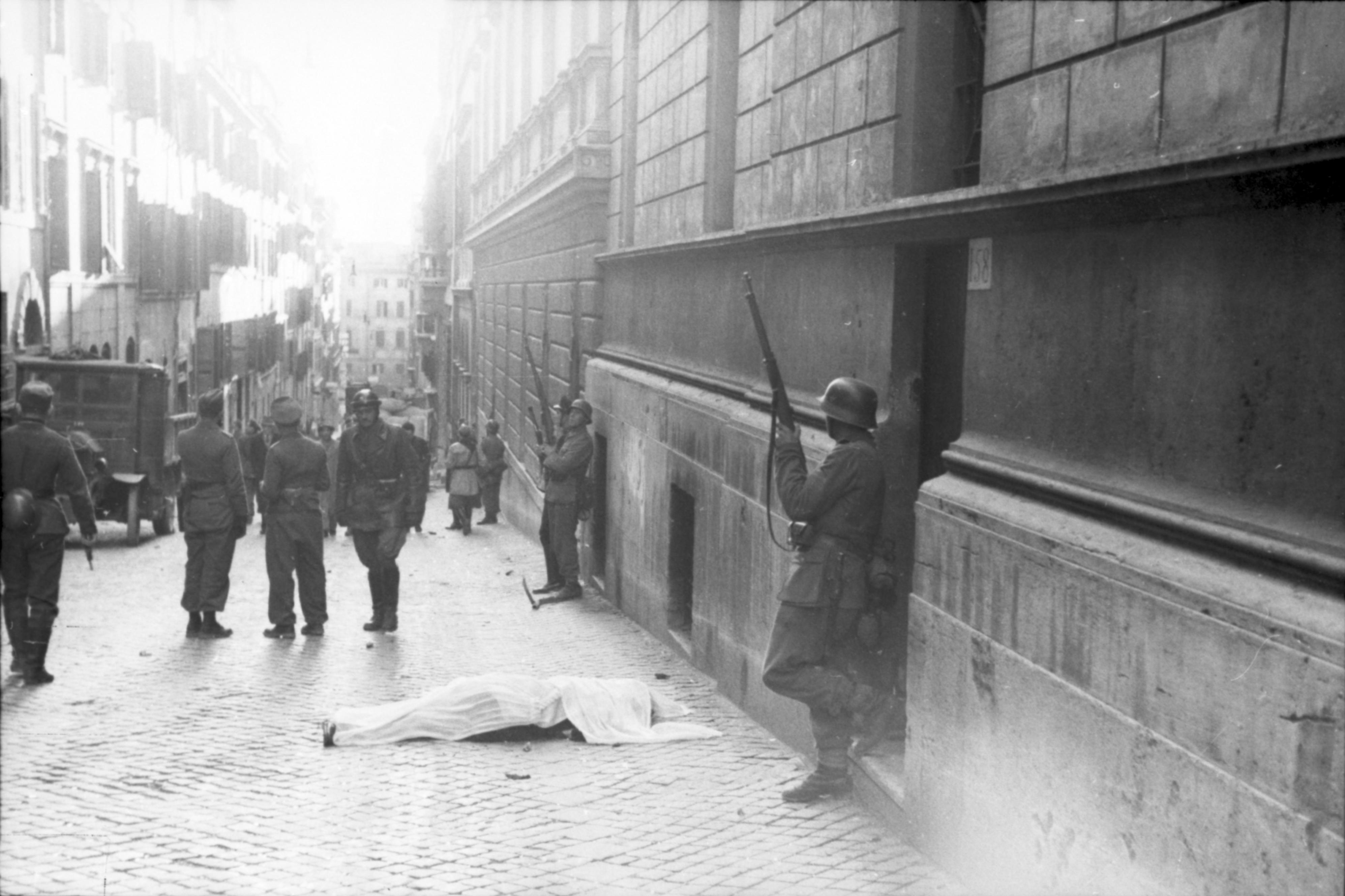
- Members of the Polizeiregiment "Bozen" in Via Rasella following the attack
Date	23 March 1944
Location	Rome, Italy
Result	Successful attack, followed by fierce German retaliation during the Ardeatine massacre

Belligerents
Gruppi di Azione Patriottica (GAP)	Germany

Units involved
GAP combatants	Polizeiregiment "Bozen"

Strength
11	156

Casualties and losses
None	152 men (42 killed, 110 wounded)
- 5 Italian civilians killed ~50 Italian civilians injured

The Via Rasella attack (Italian: attacco di via Rasella) was an action taken by the Italian resistance movement against the Nazi German occupation forces in Rome, Italy, on 23 March 1944.

== Location ==
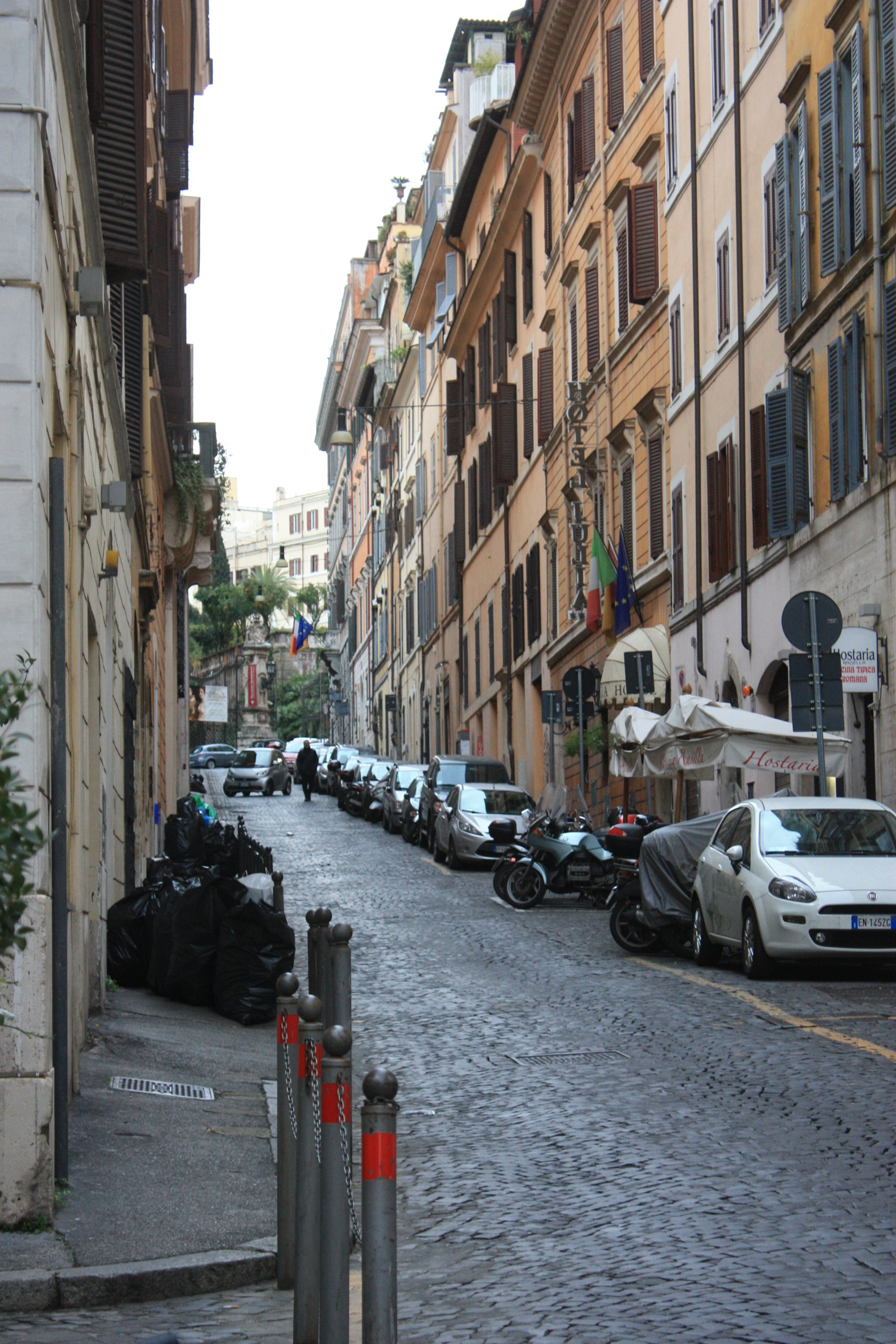
Via Rasella in 2015

Via Rasella is located in the centre of the city of Rome, in the rione of Trevi; it connects Via delle Quattro Fontane (next to the Palazzo Barberini) with Via del Traforo, and took its name from the property of the Raselli family which was located there.

== History ==
Map of the attack

The attack was led by the Gruppi di Azione Patriottica (Patriotic Action Groups) against the 11th company of the 3rd battalion of the SS-Polizeiregiment "Bozen" (Police Regiment "Bozen" from Bolzano), a military unit of the German Ordnungspolizei ("Order Police") recruited in the largely ethnic-German Alto Adige region in north-east Italy, during the de facto German annexation of the region (OZAV). At the time of the attack, the regiment was at the disposal of the German military command of the city of Rome, headed by Luftwaffe General Kurt Mälzer.

The attack was performed while the Allies were fighting the third Battle of Monte Cassino, 118 kilometers (73 miles) away from via Rasella, to gain a breakthrough to Rome.

Nazi Military Commander Albert Kesselring stated:

Rome became for us an explosive city. ... For us, the security of the rearguard of the frontline was a severe issue. The morale of our troops was directly affected, since they could not be safely sent to Rome anymore for short periods of rest.

— Albert Kesselring, Acts of the Kesselring trial, 1946–47

Rome was in the end liberated on 5 June 1944.

== The attack ==
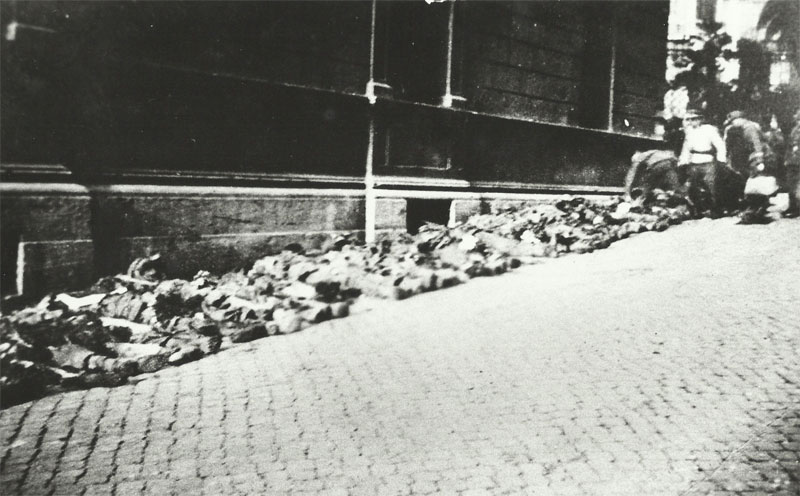
Dead Germans following the attack.

The attack on 23 March 1944 was the largest Italian partisan attack against the German troops. The GAP members, under the orders of Carlo Salinari (Spartacus) and Franco Calamandrei (Cola), were on Via Rasella during the passage of a company of the Police Regiment "Bozen", consisting of 156 men.

The action began with the explosion of a bomb deposited by Rosario Bentivegna. Eleven other partisans participated:

- Via del Boccaccio: Franco Calamandrei, placed at the corner of the street, Carlo Salira near the tunnel and Silvio Serra;
- Via Rasella: Carla Capponi, Raul Falcioni, Fernando Vitagliano, Pasquale Balsamo, Francesco Curreli, Guglielmo Blasi, Mario Fiorentini and Marisa Musu who provided cover fire by using a mortar.

The other members of the group were absent for various reasons: Lucia Ottobrini was ill, and Maria Teresa Regard was opposed to the choice of the place of the attack.

The attack saw the annihilation of the 11th company and caused the death of 33 men on 23 March 1944 and about 110 wounded (60 Germans, c. 50 civilians) as well as five civilians (including the 13-year-old Piero Zucceretti), while the partisans did not have any losses. A 34th German died on 24 March 1944, and eight more succumbed to their wounds in the next two weeks.

== German retaliation ==
=== Ardeatine Caves ===
In retaliation, the German troops killed 335 persons, prisoners and passerby rounded up, and almost all of them civilians, in the Ardeatine massacre, organized and conducted by SS Obersturmbannführer (Lieutenant colonel) Herbert Kappler, head of Sicherheitspolizei ("Security Police") and Sicherheitsdienst ("Security Service") in Rome.

== Bibliography ==
- Wedekind, Michael (2003). Nationalsozialistische Besatzungs- und Annexionspolitik in Norditalien 1943 bis 1945.: Die Operationszonen Alpenvorland und Adriatisches Küstenland (in German). Oldenburg Verlag. p. 523. ISBN 3-486-56650-4.
- Staron, Joachim (2002). Fosse Ardeatine und Marzabotto: Deutsche Kriegsverbrechen und Resistenza (in German). Paderborn: Verlag Ferdinand Schöning. p. 392. ISBN 3-506-77522-7.
