= Lorenzo Chierici =

Italian police officer

Commander of the Forestry Militia
- In office 5 December 1941 – 14 April 1943
- Preceded by: Augusto Agostini
- Succeeded by: Guido Felici
- Chief of the Italian Police
- In office 16 April 1943 – 25 July 1943
- Preceded by: Carmine Senise
- Succeeded by: Carmine Senise

Personal details
- Born: 11 January 1895 Reggio Emilia, Kingdom of Italy
- Died: 19 November 1943 (aged 48) Treviso, Italian Social Republic
- Party: National Fascist Party

Military service
- Allegiance: Kingdom of Italy
- Branch/service: Royal Italian Army; Milizia Volontaria per la Sicurezza Nazionale
- Awards: War Cross of Military Valor

Lorenzo "Renzo" Chierici (11 January 1895 – 19 November 1943) was an Italian Fascist official, prefect and soldier, who served as Commander of the Forestry Militia from December 1941 to April 1943 and Chief of the Italian Police from April to July 1943.

== Biography ==
Chierici was born in Reggio Emilia and studied law. During the First World War he enlisted in the Royal Italian Army as a volunteer, reaching the rank of captain by 1918; after the end of the war he was among Gabriele D’Annunzio’s legionnaires who occupied Fiume in 1920, and in the same year he joined the National Fascist Party.

He quickly rose through the ranks of the Voluntary Militia for National Security, becoming console (Colonel) by 1926, when he was transferred to the Forestry Militia and subsequently promoted to console generale (brigadier-general). In 1929 he became federal secretary of the PNF of Ferrara. From July 1935 to August 1939 he served as Prefect of Pescara, and in 1939 he was appointed prefect of the Province of Pola, remaining in office until December 1941. On 5 December 1941 he was appointed commander of the Forestry Militia with the rank of luogotenente generale (Major General).

Chierici in his youth

On 14 April 1943 he was appointed by Benito Mussolini as Chief of the Police, replacing Carmine Senise, but after Mussolini's removal from power on 25 July 1943 he had to relinquish the post to his predecessor. Before the coup, Chierici had warned Mussolini that the members of the Grand Council of Fascism were preparing to vote a motion of no confidence against him, but after Mussolini's arrest he ordered his men to participate in the repression of unrest caused by Fascist loyalists in Rome. Chierici was then reinstated by the new prime minister Pietro Badoglio to the rank of lieutenant colonel of the Royal Italian Army, and given command of an Alpini battalion in South Tyrol.

After the Armistice of Cassibile Chierici was arrested in Rome by the Nazis and handed him over to the authorities of the Italian Social Republic. Considered a traitor, he was repeatedly tortured and died in prison in unclear circumstances; according to most sources he was murdered in his cell, possibly in order to prevent him from testifying at the Verona Trial about the events of 25 July 1943.
