= Tullio Tamburini =

Italian soldier, adventurer and fascist official

Tullio Tamburini

Tullio Tamburini (22 April 1892 – 2 November 1957) was an Italian soldier, adventurer and fascist official.

== Life ==
Born in Prato, Tamburini had been a schoolteacher in Florence but was sacked from his job. He then made his way as a petty criminal before serving in the Italian Army during the First World War without distinction. Attached to the 'mopping-up units' after the war, he was accused of looting whilst in the course of his duties.

He joined the fascio in Florence in 1922 and was appointed consul in the local militia the following year. From early on he was associated with the intransigenti tendency within fascism, favouring the violence of the squadrons as a means to achieve fascism. As a squadron leader he garnered a reputation for extreme violence and in October 1925 he was dismissed and sent to Tripolitania for this reason. At the time Florence had become a by-word for the excesses of fascist violence and as a result Mussolini removed a number of leading party men in the city as he sought to normalize Italy under his control. He was brought back in September 1926 as part of a delegation to the League of Nations before being given command of the Milizia Nazionale Forestale, an arm of the Blackshirts devoted to forestry.

Back in favour, Tamburini was given the role of prefetto of Avellino in 1936, switching to the same position in Ancona in 1939, then Trieste in 1941. Following the establishment of the Italian Social Republic Tamburini was appointed chief of police on 1 October 1943. Tamburini was unable to leave his old ways behind in his new position and in January 1944 he was charged with illicit enrichment, a charge that led to his dismissal in April. Tamburini soon became a figure of suspicion for the Germans, who believed him to be in secret contact with the Allies, and in February he was sent to Dachau concentration camp by General Karl Wolff.

In the end Tamburini was only briefly in Dachau and soon returned to Italy, although he was then sent to prison in his homeland for his involvement in the fascist regime. He was amnestied in September 1946 and emigrated to Buenos Aires the following year.
