= Adele Bei =

Italian politician (1904–1976)

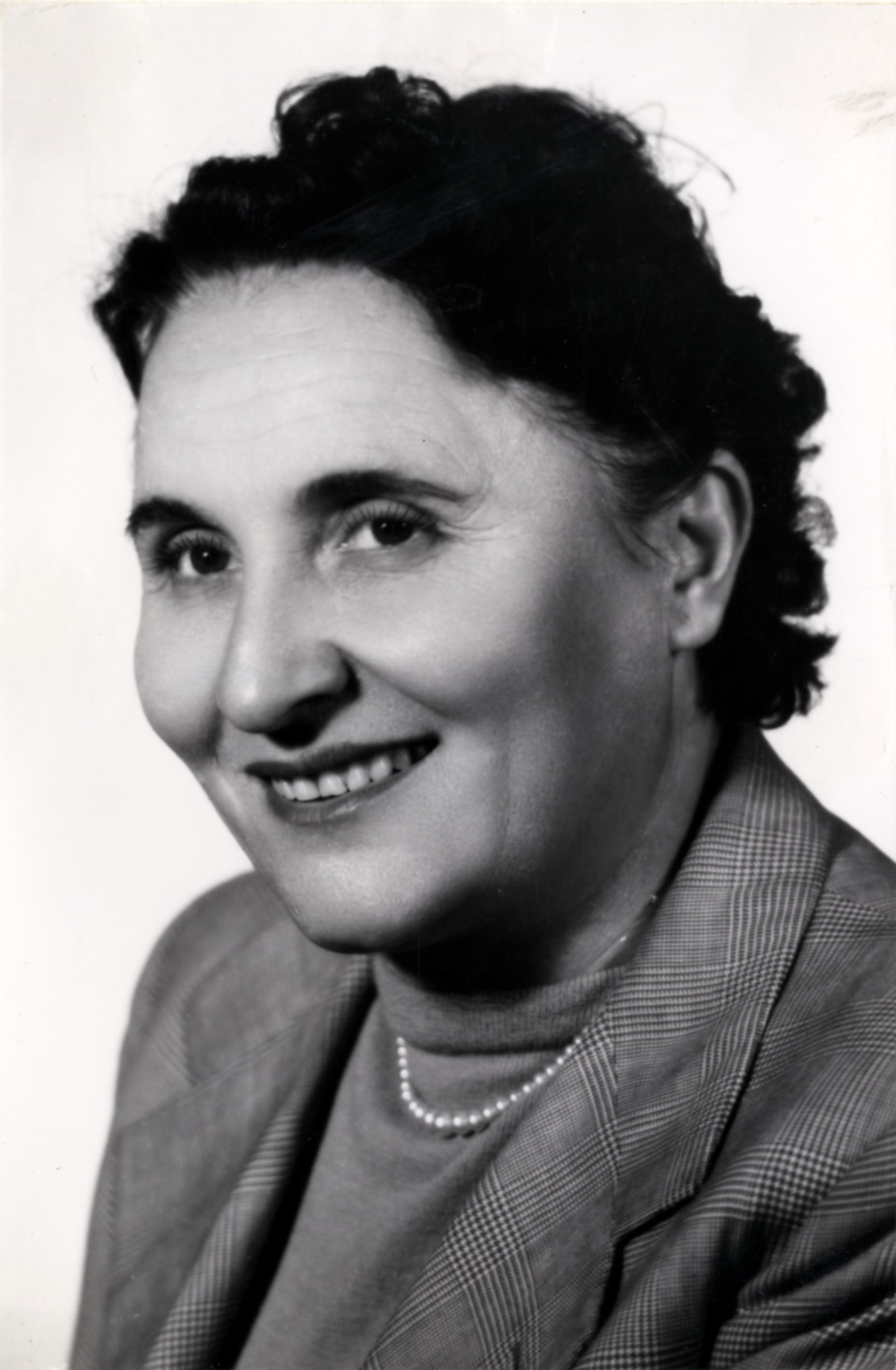
- Official portrait, 1948

Member of the Chamber of Deputies
- In office 25 June 1953 – 15 May 1963
- Constituency: Ancona

Member of the Senate
- In office 8 May 1948 – 24 June 1953 (Ex officio)

Member of the Constituent Assembly
- In office 25 June 1946 – 31 January 1948
- Constituency: Ancona

Personal details
- Born: 4 May 1904 Cantiano, Kingdom of Italy
- Died: 15 October 1976 (aged 72) Rome, Italy
- Party: Italian Communist Party (PCI)
- Spouse: Domenico Ciufoli (m. 1922; died 1975)
- Occupation: Trade unionist; politician

Adele Bei Ciufoli (née Bei; 4 May 1904 – 15 October 1976) was an Italian trade unionist and politician. She was elected to the Constituent Assembly in 1946 as part of the first group of women parliamentarians in Italy. She was subsequently appointed to the Senate in 1948 and then elected to the Chamber of Deputies in 1953. She remained a member of parliament until 1963.

== Biography ==
Bei was born in Cantiano, Marche, in 1904, the third of eleven children of Angela Broccoli and Davide Bei, a woodcutter. With her family suffering from poverty, she began working as a farm labourer aged 12. She met Domenico Ciufoli, a founder member of the Italian Communist Party, and the two married in 1922. Following the rise to power of Benito Mussolini, the couple left Italy in 1923, initially moving to Belgium. After their daughter Angela was born in June the following year, the family moved to Luxembourg. A son, Ferrero, was born in 1926 and the family subsequently moved to France, initially settling in Marseille before relocating to Paris.

Bei herself joined the Communist Party in 1931. Under the name Battistella, she made clandestine trips to Italy to carry out liaison activities. She was sent to Rome in 1933, but was arrested and sentenced to eighteen years in prison by the Tribunale speciale per la difesa dello Stato in a trial the following year. She spent seven and a half years in prison in Perugia, and then two and a half years of house arrest in Ventotene before being released in August 1943 following Mussolini's removal from power. While she was in prison and Domenico was involved in Communist Party activities in Moscow and Paris, the children had been at the Ivanovo International Children's Home in Russia. Domenico was arrested in 1939 and spent World War II in Buchenwald concentration camp.

Following her release, Bei resumed Communist Party activities and was part of the resistance to the Italian Social Republic in Rome. After Rome was liberated in 1944, she became head of the women's advisory commission of the Italian General Confederation of Labour (CGIL) and was amongst the founders of the Union of Italian Women. In 1945 she travelled to the Soviet Union as part of a trade union delegation and had brought her children back to Italy. However, Ferraro died shortly after the move to Italy, and around the same time, her marriage broke down.

Later in 1945 Bei was appointed to the National Council by the CGIL. She was a Communist Party candidate in Marche in the 1946 general elections and was one of 21 women elected. Following the 1948 elections she was appointed to the Senate as a 'Senator-by-right', a position reserved for members of the Constituent Assembly who had been jailed for five or more years, or had held office before Mussolini came to power. She successfully ran as a Communist Party candidate for the Chamber of Deputies in Ancona in the 1953 elections and was re-elected in 1958, serving until 1963.

Bei died in Rome in 1976.

== Electoral history ==
Election	House	Constituency	Party	Votes	Result	Source
1946	Constituent Assembly	Ancona–Pesaro–Macerata–Ascoli Piceno	Italian Communist Party	7,549	Elected	
1953	Chamber of Deputies	Ancona–Pesaro–Macerata–Ascoli Piceno	Italian Communist Party	15,610	Elected	
1958	Chamber of Deputies	Ancona–Pesaro–Macerata–Ascoli Piceno	Italian Communist Party	13,942	Elected	
