= Forestry Militia =

Italian Blackshirt forestry agency

The Forestry Militia (Italian: Milizia Forestale) was the branch of the Volunteer Militia for National Security tasked with protecting and managing Italy's forestry resources and national parks, and countering poaching and other environmental crimes. It was formed in 1926, replacing the Royal Forestry Corps, and dissolved in 1948, being in turn replaced by the State Forestry Corps.

In 1930 its force consisted of 337 officers and 3,441 men, and by the end of the decade it had risen to over 20,000 men, divided into seven Legions (with headquarters in Udine, Trento, Turin, Florence, Rome, Caserta and Reggio Calabria) which were later increased to twelve (with the addition of legions in Brescia and Bologna), including one each in Libya, Albania and Italian East Africa.

Its first commander was General Giuseppe Boriani, replaced in 1928 by General Augusto Agostini, its longest serving commander, who in 1941 was in turn replaced by General Lorenzo Chierici. In April 1943 Chierici was appointed Chief of the Italian Police and replaced by General Guido Felici at the head of the Forestry Militia.

During World War II units of the Forestry Militia participated in anti-partisan duties in occupied Greece and Yugoslavia.
