= Carla Capponi =

Italian politician (1918–2000)

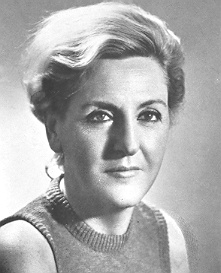

Member of the Chamber of Deputies
- In office 25 May 1972 – 4 July 1976
- Constituency: Rome
- In office 25 June 1953 – 11 June 1958
- Constituency: Rome

Personal details
- Born: 7 December 1918 Rome, Italy
- Died: 24 November 2000 (aged 81) Zagarolo, Italy
- Party: Italian Communist Party
- Occupation: Politician, Partisan
- Nickname: The Little English Girl

Military service
- Rank: Captain
- Unit: National Liberation Committee

Carla Capponi, aka The Little English Girl (7 December 1918 – 24 November 2000), was an Italian partisan and politician who received the Gold Medal of Military Valour for her participation in the Italian resistance movement.

== Biography ==
=== Youth ===
Carla Capponi grew up in Rome, where she was the eldest of three children. She attended the Ennio Quirino Visconti Liceo Ginnasio in the same class as Carlo Lizzani and Piero Della Seta, the future Communist city councillor Piero Della Seta. In 1940 her father who was a mining engineer died and the three sisters had to work, forcing Carla Capponi to abandon her studies of law.

On 19 July 1943, immediately after the bombing of San Lorenzo, Carla rushed to the Policlinico Hospital in search of her mother and remained there as a volunteer; subsequently she allowed clandestinely communist activists to gather in her apartment in front of the Trajan's Forum, including Gioacchino Gesmundo, Luciano Lusana, Adele Bei, Carla Angelini and Mario Leporatti. In one of these meetings she met Rosario Bentivegna, three years younger medical student; while in via Margutta instead, in the studio of the sculptor Nino Franchina, she met the activist Filiberto Sbardella (one of the leaders of the Red Flag).

=== Italian resistance ===
Around the time of the German occupation of Italy (1939–1945), she joined the Italian Communist Party and began her involvement in the resistance. A comrade in the struggle described her as "this young blonde woman who went out at night to shoot Germans... with arms in hand, first among the first, she participated in dozens of actions, distinguishing herself in a superb way." During the war, she was known as the "little English girl" (Inglesina).

Among her first major actions was the assassination of a German officer leaving the Hotel Excelsior carrying a briefcase with defence plans for the city. Capponi described the action:

"It was a traumatic experience. I almost wanted to call to him, to make him turn around... but I knew he was armed. It seemed impossible that with my peaceful disposition, against any form of violence, I should hold the gun, point it at him and shoot him in the back. I took his briefcase. I was in shock... I began running down the street with the gun still in my hand... It was raining and tears were streaming down my face... After getting over the initial shock, especially since many of our comrades were being arrested and tortured, all our scruples were replaced by sheer determination to fight for our cause."

During the Via Rasella attack on 23 March 1944, she became a vice-commander of a Gruppi di Azione Patriottica (GAP; "Patriotic Action Groups") squad.

=== Post-war ===
On 22 September 1944, Capponi married Rosario Bentivegna, with whom she had fought in the resistance. In 1945, she gave birth to a daughter named Elena. The couple later divorced in 1974.

In 1953 she was elected to the Chamber of Deputies as a member of the Italian Communist Party. She served two terms, from 1953 to 1958 and later from 1972 to 1976. A few months before her death she published the memoirs "Con cuore di donna". She also served on the executive committee of the National Association of Italian Partisans until her death in 2000. The body was cremated and initially buried at the Verano cemetery. In 2014, her daughter Elena (who died the following year, in 2015, at 69 years of age), not having obtained the opportunity to bury her parents together, in 80 centimetres of earth in the non-Catholic cemetery of Rome at Testaccio, as desired by themselves, respected their will, as a second hypothesis, to have scattered their ashes in the Tiber river.

Capponi one of only sixteen Italian women to be awarded the Gold Medal of Military Valour.

== Electoral history ==
Election	House	Constituency	Party	Votes	Result
1953	Chamber of Deputies	Rome–Viterbo–Latina–Frosinone	PCI	13,691	Elected
1958	Chamber of Deputies	Rome–Viterbo–Latina–Frosinone	PCI	5,629	Not elected
1972	Chamber of Deputies	Rome–Viterbo–Latina–Frosinone	PCI	40,585	Elected
