= OVRA =

Fascist secret police in the Kingdom of Italy (1927–1945)

- Opera Vigilanza Repressione Antifascismo
- Lesser coat of arms of Fascist Italy

Agency overview
- Formed: 1927
- Dissolved: 1945
- Type: Secret police
- Jurisdiction: Kingdom of Italy; Italian Social Republic
- Employees: 50,000
- Agency executive: Arturo Bocchini

The OVRA, unofficially known as the Organization for Vigilance and Repression of Anti-Fascism (Italian: Opera Vigilanza Repressione Antifascismo), was the secret police of the Kingdom of Italy during the reign of King Victor Emmanuel III. It was founded in 1927 under the regime of Italian fascist dictator Benito Mussolini. The OVRA was the Italian precursor of Nazi Germany's secret police. Mussolini's secret police were assigned to stop any anti-fascist activity or sentiment. Approximately 50,000 OVRA agents infiltrated most aspects of domestic life in Italy. The OVRA, headed by Arturo Bocchini, never appeared in any official document, so the official name of the organization still remains unclear. Its former director Guido Leto claimed after WW2 that Mussolini picked the letters for name simply because they sounded mysterious and intimidating. (Note: Possible official names include Opera Vigilanza Repressione Antifascismo, Opera Volontaria di Repressione Antifascista, Organizzazione di Vigilanza e Repressione dell'Antifascismo, Organo di Vigilanza dei Reati Antistatali, Opera di Vigilanza e Repressione dell'Antifascismo, and possibly a reference to the octopus (piovra in Italian) or Okhrana (the secret police of the Russian Empire).)

== Origin ==
In the aftermath of the attempted assassination of Mussolini by the young Anteo Zamboni, in Bologna on 31 October 1926, a swath of repressive legislation was swiftly enacted by the Italian government. All political parties, associations, and organizations opposed to Fascist Italy were dissolved, and everybody who was proven to have "committed or expressed intention to commit actions directed to violently subvert the social, economic or national order or undermine national security or to oppose or obstruct the actions of the government" could be sent into exile in remote locations by the police.

On 25 November 1926, the new Legge di Difesa dello Stato (State Defense Law) instituted a Tribunale Speciale (Special Court) to try those who were accused of being "enemies of the state", and sentence them to harsh prison terms or even to death, as the death penalty had also been restored under the new law. Priority was given to the reorganization of the National Police Force, known as Pubblica Sicurezza (PS), under career police officer Arturo Bocchini. The new Code of Laws concerning Public Security (Testo Unico delle Leggi di Pubblica Sicurezza, TULPS) enacted in 1926 and revised in 1931, specified a "Department of Political Police" as a special division of the force with the aim of controlling and preventing political dissent. Later, this division came to be known as OVRA, although its existence remained secret until December 1930 when the official press agency Agenzia Stefani released a statement quoting the OVRA as a "special section" of the police force.

== Keeping the fascist regime in power ==
Bocchini appointed inspector Francesco Nudi as head of the OVRA. Nudi was later replaced by Guido Leto. The OVRA compiled files on around 130,000 potential subversives with the aid of a network of approximately 100,000 informants, and by 1930 they were organising around 20,000 raids each week. It is believed that about 6,000 of the people arrested by the OVRA, mainly communists and members of the Giustizia e Libertà, were either tried by the Tribunale Speciale or sent into exile on remote Mediterranean islands. The conditions in these places were extremely poor, so many anti-fascists simply left Italy for their own safety.

It is known that Heinrich Himmler met with Bocchini repeatedly and modeled the organization of Nazi Germany's secret police on that of the OVRA. A secret protocol was signed on 2 April 1936 by the heads of the two police organizations to further cooperation and collaboration. One of the chief duties of the OVRA was to operate and maintain the Casellario Politico Centrale (CPC), a special archive where all personal information about known "subversives" was dutifully compiled to create a "personal profile" containing all data concerning the subject's education, culture, and habits, down to minute details about personal character and sexual orientation.

=== Spying on the Vatican ===
A major duty for the OVRA was spying on Pope Pius XI, as the Roman Catholic Church was an extremely powerful institution in Italian life that the fascist regime never controlled, instead having a partnership with. It was a common practice of the OVRA to catch Roman Catholic priests in flagrante delicto and blackmail them into spying for the OVRA, which was therefore always very well informed about the affairs of the Holy See. The American historian David Kertzer described the OVRA's spy network within the Vatican as "robust", comprising four highly placed clerics and a number of lay Vatican employees. Mussolini was fascinated by reports of homosexual activity among senior Catholic clerics and always had them sent to his office for him to read.

The OVRA had a very long file on the Pope's Master of Ceremonials, his close friend Monsignor Camillo Caccia Dominioni. He was known to sexually molest young boys, despite the Pope being aware of this, at least from 1926 on. Another homosexual cleric was Monsignor Ricardo Sanz de Samper, the Prefect of the Pope's Household and papal majordomo, whose fondness for sex with young boys became so open that even Pius was forced to dismiss him in 1928. Another long OVRA file was on the Jesuit Father Pietro Tacchi Venturi, the Pope's emissary to Mussolini, who often had "illicit" relations with young men and had been wounded in a lover's quarrel, which he tried to pass off as an anti-fascist assassination attempt. The Pope retained Venturi as his preferred liaison with Mussolini, despite this obvious fabrication. Another senior cleric blackmailed by the OVRA was Monsignor Enrico Pucci, the chief of the Vatican press department, who worked as an informer for the OVRA from October 1927 onward. Pucci as a rule did not see the Pope very often. However, he met on a daily basis with the Pope's advisers, to get directions for the editorial stance of the Vatican media. This provided the OVRA with much information. One of the most important informers in the Vatican remains anonymous. His OVRA file simply describes him as the "noted Vatican informer". Kertzer wrote that judging from the high-quality intelligence he provided, the "noted Vatican informer" must have been someone very senior, so that his name was never written down.

== During the Second World War ==
During World War II, the OVRA was used by Mussolini to control resistance groups in the Balkans (Josip Broz Tito's National Liberation Army especially) prior to the 1943 armistice of Cassibile and withdrawal. In 1943, with the Allied invasion of Italy starting the Italian campaign, the OVRA began to recruit double agents to infiltrate the British Special Operations Executives; these efforts failed to stop Mussolini's ouster. With the establishment of the Italian Social Republic in Northern Italy, many OVRA agents flocked to this state led by Mussolini, fighting until Mussolini was executed by Italian partisans on 28 April 1945. OVRA agents were favourite targets of communist partisans, as they were a symbol of the fascist government.

== Legacy ==
After the war ended, the OVRA was officially disbanded. A decree issued on 26 April 1945 stated that the CPC should be maintained and "updated with all the information pertaining to anybody whose political activity is aimed at breaking the laws and regulations enacted by the democratic Government against neo-Fascism, anarchists who are by definition against any law and government, and political activists whose moral depravity and contempt of law could prompt them to instigate unrest or commit acts of terrorism". Later, a division of the PS named Servizio Informazioni Speciali (Special Informations Service, better known as SIS) was set up by the new Minister of Interior, the Italian Socialist Party member Giuseppe Romita, as a result of a new reorganization of the Police offices, with the task of taking over the management of the CPC and investigating politically motivated crimes and other felonies related to that particular time (such as black marketeering, etc.), and that many of the former officers of the OVRA were being reinstated as members of the new SIS. Even the person appointed as head of SIS was Inspector General Santoro, one of Leto's former deputies. Most of the laws and regulations of the old TULPS of 1931 were kept in force by the Italian Republic, and Leto was later reinstated as a fully fledged national Police officer, and entrusted with the supervision and coordination of police academies in post-war Italy.

== Cultural depiction ==
The organization was depicted in the Japanese animated film Porco Rosso.

== See also ==
- The Conformist – 1970 political psychological drama film set in Fascist Italy during the 1930s
- Gestapo – Nazi Germany's secret police
- Kempeitai – Imperial Japan's secret police and military police
- Milice – collaborationist police militia in Vichy France
- Political-Social Brigade – Francoist Spain's secret police
- Servizio Informazioni Militare – Fascist Italy's military intelligence service

== Bibliography ==
- Kertzer, David I. (2014). The Pope and Mussolini: The Secret History of Pius XI and the Rise of Fascism in Europe. Oxford University Press. ISBN 9780198716167.
- Melton, H. Keith (1996). The Ultimate Spy. London: DK. ISBN 0-86438-875-6.
- Wagner, Margaret E., Osbourne, Linda Barrett, Reyburn, Susan, and the Staff of the Library of Congress (2007). The Library Congress World War II Companion. New York, London, Toronto, Sydney: Symon & Schuster. pp. 982. ISBN 978-0-7432-5219-5.
