= Antonello Trombadori =

Italian politician (1917–1993)

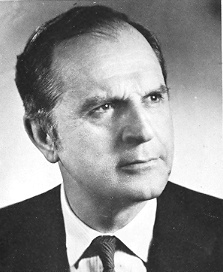
Antonello Trombadori, 1972

Antonello Trombadori (April 24, 1917, in Rome – January 19, 1993, in Rome) was an Italian politician, art critic and journalist.

Born in Rome into a family of artists (his father Francesco Trombadori was a painter) Trombadori lived a happy life in the Villa Strohl-Fern studio-home of his city, coming into contact with numerous intellectuals of the era. An intimate friend of Renato Guttuso and Corrado Cagli, he collaborated with them in his youth on a series of important magazines, including La Ruota, Primato, Città, Corrente and Cinema.

Between the years of 1937 and 1940 he participated in a secret propaganda effort to convince Italian youth to abandon fascism. He was arrested in 1941 and brought in front of the Special Tribunal, where he was found guilty and sentenced to imprisonment. Due to his family’s celebrity, Benito Mussolini offered him absolution in return for a public apology and admission of tort. Trombadori refused and was consequentially jailed. In July 1943 he escaped from prison and in collaboration with Giorgio Amendola, he attempted to defend Rome from the Nazis and was subsequently arrested by the Germans in February 1944. He managed to escape in August of the same year.

Soon after the Liberation of Rome he organized an exhibition titled “L’arte contro la barbarie [Art against barbarism]”. In 1945 he presented Renato Guttuso’s album of drawings, Gott mit uns and in the same year helped Roberto Rossellini and Carlo Lizzani in filming the masterpiece Roma, città aperta (Rome, Open City).

Trombadori was an influential member of the Italian Communist Party (PCI), becoming a member of its Central Committee. In 1967 he was envoyee to Vietnam for the party's journal, L'Unità. He collaborated also with Rinascita. Trombadori was elected four times in the Italian Chamber of Deputies for PCI, but in 1993 he declared himself "No more a Communist" and a voter of the Italian Socialist Party.

Amongst his most important critical contributions were his introductions to the retrospective publications Donghi (Antonio Donghi) and Scipione (Gino Bonichi; both of 1985); Scuola romana (1986) and Roma appena ieri (Rome Just Yesterday) (1987). He also served as editor of the catalogue of artworks at Palazzo Montecitorio, the seat of the Chamber of Deputies.

He married Fulvia Trozzi, daughter of the famous lawyer and socialist parliamentary Mario Trozzi and had two children: Duccio and Lucilla, and later have three granddaughters, Cecilia (1976), Hortense (1979) and Charlotte (1991).
