= Gruppi di Azione Patriottica =

Small groups of Italian partisans during WWII

Patriotic Action Groups
- Gruppi di Azione Patriottica
- Flag of the Garibaldi Brigades
- Leaders: Franco Calamandrei; Carlo Salinari
- Dates active: October 1943 – May 1944
- Ideology: Communism; Marxism–Leninism; Anti-fascism
- Part of: Garibaldi Brigades
- Wars: Second World War

The Patriotic Action Groups (Italian: Gruppi di Azione Patriottica; GAP), formed by the general command of the Garibaldi Brigades at the end of October 1943, were small groups of partisans that were born on the initiative of the Italian Communist Party to operate mainly in the city, based on the experience of the French Resistance. The militants of the GAP were called Gappisti. By extension, the less numerous partisan city units formed from the Socialist Party and Action Party were also called GAP.

One of the successful operations of the GAP was the Via Rasella attack in March 1944. Led by Bruno Fanciullacci, members of the GAP also assassinated Italian fascist philosopher Giovanni Gentile in April 1944.
