= Massacre in Rome =

1973 Italian film by George P. Cosmatos

- US film poster
- Directed by: George P. Cosmatos
- Written by: Robert Katz; George P. Cosmatos
- Based on: Death in Rome (1967 book) by Robert Katz
- Produced by: Carlo Ponti
- Starring: Richard Burton; Marcello Mastroianni; Leo McKern; John Steiner; Anthony Steel; Renzo Montagnani; Delia Boccardo
- Cinematography: Marcello Gatti
- Edited by: Françoise Bonnot; Roberto Silvi
- Music by: Ennio Morricone
- Production company: Compagnia Cinematografica Champion; Les Films Concordia; Surf Film; Mandala Film; Philip M. Breen Productions
- Distributed by: Produzioni Atlas Consorziate (Italy); Sofradis (France); Grand National Pictures (UK)
- Release dates: 4 October 1973 (Italy); July 1975 (UK); 31 August 1977 (France)
- Running time: 110 minutes
- Country: Italy; France; United Kingdom
- Language: English

Massacre in Rome (Italian: Rappresaglia, lit. 'Reprisal') is a 1973 war drama film directed by George Pan Cosmatos, about the Ardeatine massacre which occurred at the Ardeatine caves in Rome, 24 March 1944, committed by the Germans as a reprisal for a partisan attack against the SS Police Regiment Bozen. The film was based on the 1967 book Death in Rome by Robert Katz, who co-wrote the screenplay with Cosmatos.

It stars Richard Burton and as Gestapo chief Herbert Kappler and Marcello Mastroianni as Father Pietro Antonelli, a composite character based on different Vatican officials. The supporting cast features Leo McKern, John Steiner, Anthony Steel, Renzo Montagnani and Delia Boccardo. The film was an Italian-French co-production (shot in English) by Carlo Ponti.

The film was met with significant controversy on initial release, over its central claim that Pope Pius XII knew of and did nothing about the execution of Italian hostages by the Germans. A libel suit launched by the late Pope's family saw Ponti, Cosmatos, and Katz given six-month suspended sentences, which were later dropped on appeal.

== Plot ==
The film follows Rome Gestapo chief Herbert Kappler, who carries out the killings of 335 mostly randomly and hurriedly selected victims in revenge for partisans killing 33 Germans: using a ratio of ten Italian victims for every German. However, they had rounded up five more than expected but continued on with their plan. Meanwhile, the Vatican stands by and issues no condemnation.

The names of the victims are shown in the closing credits, as opposed to the cast credits and crew members.

== Cast ==
SS personnel

- Richard Burton as SS-Obersturmbannführer Herbert Kappler
- John Steiner as SS-Standartenführer Eugen Dollmann
- Anthony Steel as SS-Sturmbannführer Dr. Borante Domizlaff
- Brook Williams as SS-Hauptsturmführer Erich Priebke
- Dennis Burgess as SS-Sturmbannführer Hellmuth Dobbrick
- Carlos De Carvalho as SS-Hauptsturmführer Carl-Theodor Schütz
- Anthony Dawson as SS-Brigadeführer Wilhelm Harster
- Douglas Hare as SS-Obersturmführer Reinhold Wetjen

Luftwaffe officers

- Peter Vaughan as Generalfeldmarschall Albert Kesselring
- Leo McKern as General der Flieger Kurt Mälzer

Italian fascists

- Guidarino Guidi as Interior Minister Guido Buffarini Guidi
- Renzo Montagnani as Police Chief Pietro Caruso

Vatican officials

- Marcello Mastroianni as Father Pietro Antonelli
- Robert Harris as Father Pancrazio

Partisans

- Giancarlo Prete as Paolo Bentivegna
- Delia Boccardo as Elena
- Renzo Palmer as Giorgio Amendola
- Duilio Del Prete as Partisan

== Release ==
Massacre in Rome was released on October 4, 1973 in Italy. This was followed by a screening in France on August 31, 1977. In the United States, the film was distributed by National General Pictures.

== Historical accuracy ==
Herbert Kappler (Richard Burton) is depicted in the film as being a tired worn out man, who is disillusioned with the Nazi cause and believes that the fall of Nazi Germany is imminent. In reality, Kappler was a zealous Nazi and was sent to Rome for exactly this reason. During his time as head of the Sicherheitspolizei (Security Police) in Rome, Kappler organized the round-ups of thousands of innocent victims, oversaw raids on Jewish homes for looted valuables, and was a key figure in transporting Italian Jews to Nazi death camps. At the time of the massacre, Herbert Kappler was 37 years old. Actor Burton was just short of his 48th birthday when the film was produced, eleven years older than Kappler would have been at the time.

Father Pietro Antonelli (Marcello Mastroianni) is a combination of several different Vatican officials who personally knew Kappler, the most significant of whom was Monsignor Hugh O'Flaherty (who appears in the television film The Scarlet and the Black). One prisoner, a deserter from the Austrian army who had pretended to be an Italian, was allowed to live, as a citizen of the Reich; and he was the only witness to tell the tale of the courageous behavior of the Resistance priest, Don Pietro Pappagallo, who blessed those about to be killed, before he himself met his fate.

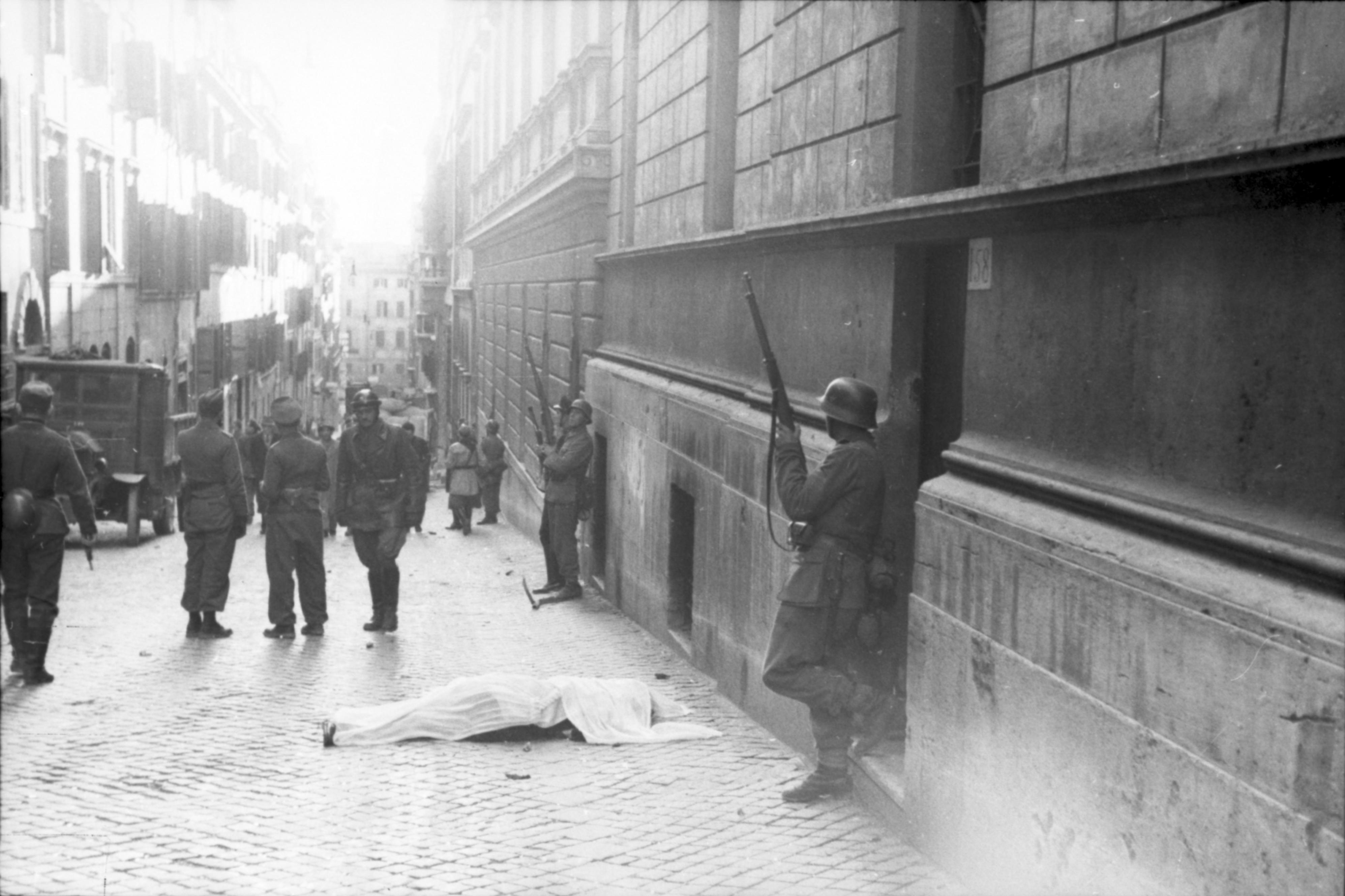
A body lies in the via Rasella during the round up of civilians by German and Italian soldiers after the partisan bombing on 23 March 1944.

The SS victims of the partisan attack are referred to throughout the film as "German soldiers", when in fact the company which was attacked was the 11th Company of the Third Battalion of the SS Police Regiment Bozen, which was composed of ethnic Austrians from German-speaking South Tyrol annexed by Italy after the First World War. Historically, the unit also did not wear SS uniforms, but rather regular German police uniforms of the Ordnungspolizei.

Kurt Mälzer (Leo McKern) is shown throughout the film giving direct orders to SS units and personally supervising the buildup to the massacre organized by Kappler. In reality, while several regular Wehrmacht officers did issue orders to the SS during this period, as well as Kappler and Mälzer personally discussing the operation, Kappler and his men were under the SS and Police Leader chain of command, and it was through these channels that most of the official orders concerning the massacre were issued. Another man working with the SS was Capt. Erich Priebke (Brook Williams), who is depicted in the film. He had full knowledge of the massacre, but would hide for many years evading justice. Then, on nationwide TV in the 1990s, ABC News reporter Sam Donaldson found and confronted him about the massacre, leading him to say he "followed orders". Argentinian authorities quickly arrested and extradited him to Italy; he was tried and convicted of mass murder.

Colonel Eugen Dollmann (John Steiner) was never Kappler's direct superior, as is implied several times in the film. In reality, Kappler answered to the office of SS-Obergruppenführer Karl Wolff, who also maintained his headquarters in Rome. Wolff is never seen or mentioned in the film. In reality, he stood trial and was found guilty of killing Italian Jews as part of the operations in Italy: when he became sick, his sentence was reduced and he was released in 1971.

== Libel lawsuit ==
Katz, the author of the book Death in Rome on which the film was based was involved in a criminal-libel suit in Italy over the contents of his book. The suit was launched by Countess Elisa betta Pacelli Rossignani, the sister of Pope Pius XII. Author Katz, producer Carlo Ponti and director Cosmatos were charged with "defaming the memory of the Pope" Pius XII regarding the Pope's alleged knowledge and not objecting to the Ardeatine massacre. All were found guilty with Katz sentenced to 14 months and Ponti and Cosmatos sentence to six months but the charges were rendered moot by a general amnesty.
