= Colm Kiernan =

Australian historian & writer (1931–2010)

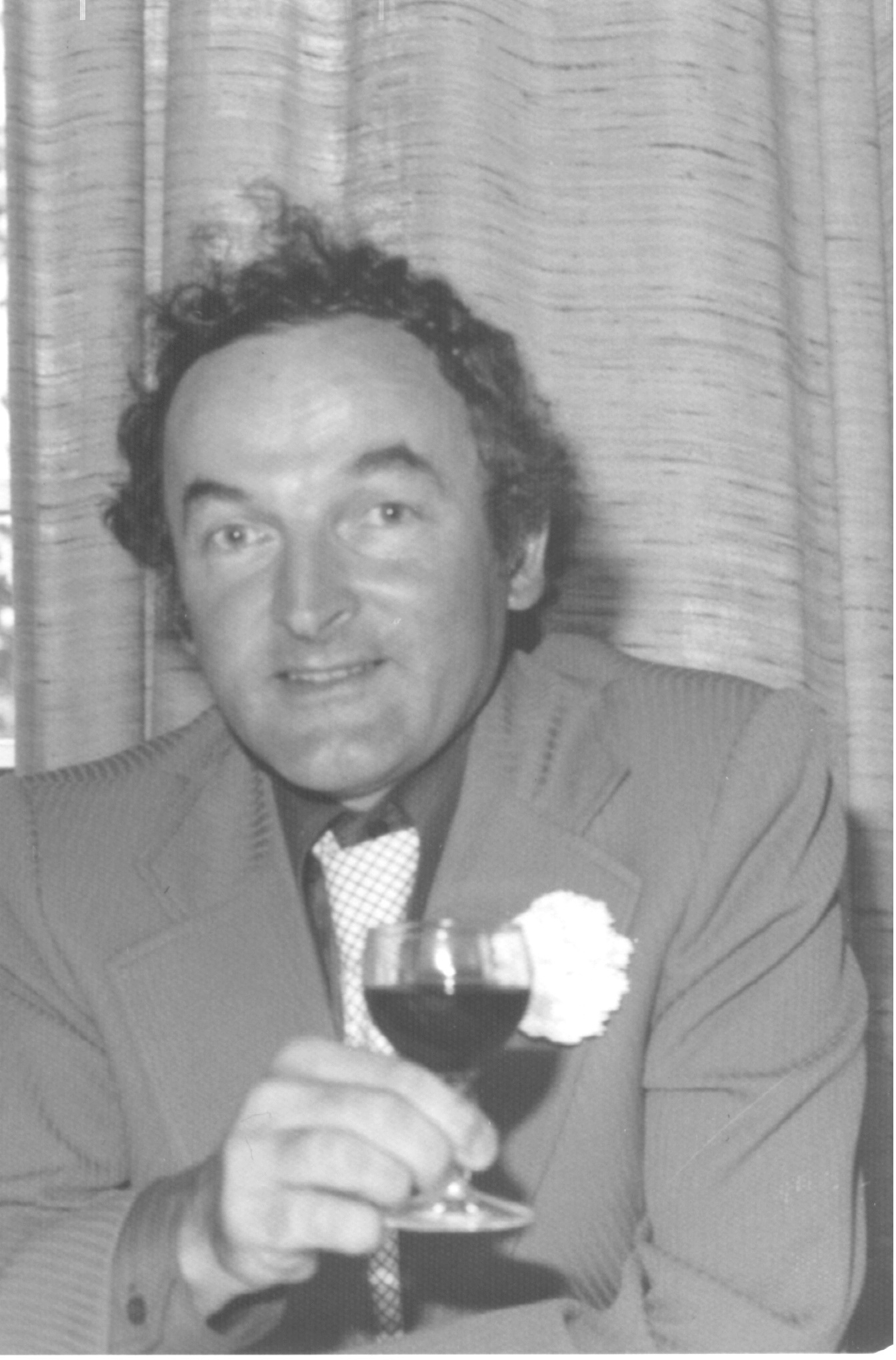
- Colm Kiernan in 1976.
- Born: Colm Padraic Kiernan; 24 November 1931; London, England
- Died: 27 March 2010 (aged 78); Wollongong, Australia
- Resting place: Lakeside Memorial Park, Kanahooka
- Education: BA, MA (Melb); BA, MA (Cantab); PhD (UNSW)
- Occupations: Historian, writer

Colm Padraic Kiernan (24 November 1931 – 27 March 2010) was an Australian historian and writer.

== Historian ==
In 1964, Colm Kiernan was appointed foundation Lecturer in History at the University of Wollongong, Australia. There began a long and successful career as an academic and researcher in both European and Australian history, which encompassed his writing of two volumes of Science and the Enlightenment of 18th Century France, the biographies of Arthur Calwell and Archbishop Daniel Mannix, and his last book, Australia and Ireland – Bicentenary Essays 1788–1988.

== Irish background ==
Kiernan was the only son of Dr Thomas Joseph Kiernan, Irish diplomat and academic, and the Irish ballad singer Delia Murphy. Thomas and Delia had four children, Blon, Nuala, Colm and Orla. Colm received a classical education at boarding school in Clongowes, Ireland, the school which James Joyce describes in his writing A Portrait of the Artist as a Young Man. During this time, his father was posted to be the Irish Ambassador to the Vatican and his family was presented to the Pope. It was a grand occasion, when he, his parents and three sisters were photographed for the local newspapers. Kiernan used to say the only thing he remembered from that occasion was that he was allowed to play on the Pope's Golden Telephone. He was a strong believer in Catholicism, and having been educated by the Jesuits, he understood the Church laws and decrees. His faith was more an intellectual spiritual belief than a practical religiosity, but it was a very deep commitment from which he never wavered. He used to say that in boarding school he had attended enough Masses to last him the rest of his life.

== Poem ==
The Irish poet Daniel Kelleher wrote this poem for Kiernan (here shown as CK) to mark his christening. It was read at his funeral.

For CK at his Christening

We wish to the new child,
A heart that can be beguiled,
By a flower,
That the wind lifts,
As it passes.
If the storms break for him,
May the trees shake for him,
Their blossoms down.

In the night that he is troubled,
May a friend wake for him,
So that his time be doubled,
And at the end of all loving and love
May the Man above,
Give him a crown.

When he was the Irish Ambassador to the United States, T. J. Kiernan recited this poem to the parents of John F. Kennedy Jr. soon after he was born in 1960. It was recited again by Senator Ted Kennedy to mark the death of John Jr. in 1999.

== Irish Australian ==
When his father was appointed as the first Irish Ambassador to Australia, in 1946, Kiernan finished his schooling at St Patrick's College, Goulburn. After completing his BA and MA at the University of Melbourne, he married Joan Louise McKay (1935–1992) on 24 August 1954, at St Christopher's Church in Manuka, A.C.T. They traveled to Cambridge, England, where Kiernan converted his degrees to a BA, MA (Cantab). Their first child was born in Cambridge, their second in Dublin, Ireland, and the third in Wollongong. Kiernan was the first PhD completion in the Arts Faculty for the University of New South Wales, Kensington.

While appointed Professor of Australian History at University College Dublin in Ireland, Kiernan researched the Irish background of many Australian political and historical figures including Henry Handel Richardson and Peter Lalor. He was well versed in Irish, Scottish Gaelic, Latin, and old English and could translate many very difficult texts including those written by the Brontë sisters, also of Irish descent, particularly Charlotte, who wrote in a mixture of Gaelic and old English.

He spoke fluent Italian, Spanish, and French, loved language, literature, and poetry, and was passionate about all things Irish Australian. He married Susan Margaret Mayer, his second wife, on 11 June 1994, and they had a son together. Kiernan is survived by Susan, his four children and nine grandchildren.

== Bibliography ==
- Kiernan, Colm (1973). The Enlightenment and science in eighteenth-century France.
- — (1978). Calwell : a personal and political biography. West Melbourne: Thomas Nelson.
- Ireland and Australia (1984) ISBN 0-207-15008-7
- Daniel Mannix and Ireland (1984) ISBN 0-949681-14-8
- Australia and Ireland, 1788–1988 : bicentenary essays (1986) ISBN 0-7171-1474-0
- The Irish in the Labor movement (1991) ISBN 0-7305-9155-7
