= Donal Courtney =

Donal Courtney may refer to:

- Donal Courtney (rugby union), Irish rugby union referee
- Donal Courtney (actor), Irish actor, director and playwright
