= The Scarlet and the Black =

1983 multi-national made-for-television film

- Genre: Drama; History; War
- Based on: The Scarlet Pimpernel of the Vatican by J.P. Gallagher
- Written by: David Butler
- Directed by: Jerry London
- Starring: Gregory Peck; Christopher Plummer; John Gielgud; Raf Vallone; Kenneth Colley; Walter Gotell; Barbara Bouchet; Julian Holloway; Angelo Infanti; Olga Karlatos
- Music by: Ennio Morricone
- Countries of origin: United States, Italy, United Kingdom
- Original language: English

Production
- Executive producer: Howard P. Alston
- Producer: Bill McCutchen
- Production locations: Rome, Italy; Vatican City
- Cinematography: Giuseppe Rotunno
- Editor: Benjamin A. Weissman
- Running time: 143 minutes
- Production companies: ITC Entertainment, RAI

Original release
- Network: CBS
- Release: February 2, 1983

The Scarlet and the Black is a 1983 Italian-American international co-production made-for-television historical war drama film directed by Jerry London, and starring Gregory Peck and Christopher Plummer. Based on J. P. Gallagher's book The Scarlet Pimpernel of the Vatican (published in 1967), the film tells the story of Monsignor Hugh O'Flaherty, a real-life Irish Catholic priest who saved thousands of Jews and escaped Allied POWs in Rome. CBS distributed more than 500,000 scripts of The Scarlet and the Black to students in elementary and high schools throughout the country, to be read aloud in class to stimulate student interest in English and history. The title The Scarlet and the Black is a reference not only to the black cassock and scarlet sash worn by monsignors and bishops in the Catholic Church, but also to the dominant colors of Nazi Party regalia.

== Plot ==
In September 1943, the German army occupies Rome following Italy's surrender to the Allies. When Pope Pius XII meets SS-General Max Helm and SS Head of Police for Rome SS-Lieutenant Colonel Herbert Kappler, the General explains that German troops, mainly Waffen SS troops detachments, will behave correctly and explains that Vatican neutrality will be respected. The Colonel then expresses concern that escaped Allied prisoners may attempt to seek refuge in the Vatican, and requests permission to paint a white line across St. Peter's Square in order to mark the extent of Vatican sovereignty. The Pope does not protest that the German Wehrmacht forces have occupied Rome, but when the officers leave, he sees out of the window that the white line had already begun to be painted.

Opposing Kappler is Monsignor O'Flaherty, an Irish-born Vatican priest who establishes an underground organization which provides safe haven and escape routes to escaped POWs, Jews, and refugees in Rome. O'Flaherty is assisted in this enterprise by others, including locals such as Francesca Lombardo (a widow) and her daughters Guilia and Emilia, and the clergy and members of the Vatican's diplomatic corps. The Nazis attempt to destroy the group, but Kappler is frustrated by O'Flaherty's successes, due to his cleverness, disguises, and his straining the limits of the Vatican's neutrality. The SS meet with Rome's Jewish council leaders, which the Nazis set up to be mediators between them and the Jews, promising protection of Rome's Jews if these leaders come up with 100 pound of pure gold and 1 million Italian lira. O'Flaherty helps them raise both but Kappler breaks his promise and deports the Jews to the camps that he said do not exist.

Met with continuous failure, Kappler begins to develop a personal vendetta against O'Flaherty, because the priest is protected by the Vatican. Despite O'Flaherty's efforts, Kappler manages to recapture many escaped POWs, deport many Jews to death camps, and exploit and oppress the general population; a number of O'Flaherty's friends are also arrested or killed, including Father Morsigne. O'Flaherty is himself the target of an assassination attempt instigated by Kappler, which however fails due to the monsignor's boxing skills. The rescue organization also nearly collapses when an American soldier, Jack, a member of the organization's committee and Guilia's love interest, is captured and his code book seized. However, the group is able to quickly get the rest of those in hiding away before Kappler and his men find them. O'Flaherty is also able to get Jack released from prison by tricking Kappler into giving him his signature, pretending to want his autograph at the opera. O'Flaherty uses it to forge a release form. The organization then resumes, and succeeds in saving many lives.

As the war progresses, the Allies begin to overcome German resistance, eventually breaking through and heading towards Rome itself. Colonel Kappler worries for his family's safety from vengeful partisans and, in a one-to-one meeting with O'Flaherty, asks him to save his family, appealing to the same values that motivated O'Flaherty to save so many others. The monsignor however refuses, amazed that after all the Colonel has done and all the atrocities for which he is responsible, he should expect mercy and forgiveness automatically without repentance, simply on request, and departs in disgust.

As the Allies enter Rome in June 1944, Monsignor O'Flaherty joins in the celebration of the liberation, during which Jack and Guilia announce their engagement, and somberly toasts those who did not live to see it. Kappler is captured in 1945, and interrogated by the Allies. During his interrogation, he is informed that his wife and children were smuggled out of Italy and escaped unharmed to Switzerland. Upon being asked who helped them, Kappler realizes who it must have been, but responds simply that he does not know.

The film's epilogue says that O'Flaherty was decorated by several Allied governments after the war. Kappler was sentenced to life imprisonment, and his only visitor was O'Flaherty, who came every month. Eventually, the former SS officer converted to the Catholic faith: The monsignor baptized him in 1959.

== Cast ==
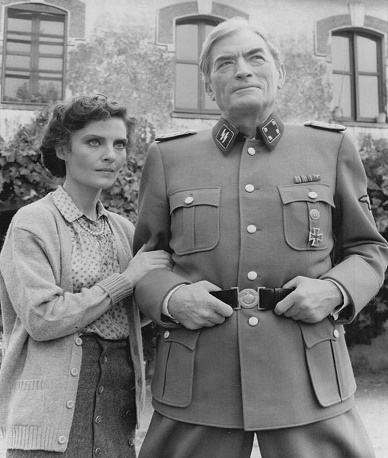
Olga Karlatos and Gregory Peck in The Scarlet and the Black

Vatican officials

- Gregory Peck as Monsignor Hugh O'Flaherty
- John Gielgud as Pope Pius XII
- Raf Vallone as Father Vittorio
- Angelo Infanti as Father Morosini
- Marne Maitland as Papal Secretary
- Stelio Candelli as O'Flaherty's secretary
- Gabriella D'Olive as Mother Superior

SS personnel

- Christopher Plummer as SS-Obersturmbannführer Herbert Kappler
- Kenneth Colley as SS-Hauptsturmführer Hirsch (representing Erich Priebke) (as Ken Colley)
- Walter Gotell as SS-Obergruppenführer Max Helm (representing General Karl Wolff)
- Michael Byrne as Reinhard Beck
- T. P. McKenna as Reichsführer Heinrich Himmler
- David Brandon as SS officer

Allied personnel

- John Terry as Lt. Jack Manning
- Phillip Hatton as Lt. Harry Barnett
- Mark Lewis as Cpl. Les Tate
- William Berger as U.S. Intelligence Officer (as Bill Berger)
- Edmund Purdom as British Intelligence Officer / Epilogue Narrator (as Edmond Purdom)

Others

- Barbara Bouchet as Minna Kappler
- Julian Holloway as Alfred West (John May)
- Olga Karlatos as Francesca Lombardo (representing Chetta Chevalier)
- Vernon Dobtcheff as Count Langenthal (representing Count Demetris Sarsfield Salazar)
- Peter Burton as Sir D'Arcy Osborne (later in life the 12th Duke of Leeds)
- Fabiana Udenio as Guila Lombardo
- Remo Remotti as Rabbi Leoni
- Giovanni Crippa as Simon Weiss
- Billy Boyle as Paddy Doyle
- Itaco Nardulli as Franz Kappler
- Cariddi Nardulli as Liesel Kappler (as Carridi Nardulli)
- Alessandra Cozzo as Emilia Lombardo
- Cesarina Tacconi as pregnant woman
- Sergio Nicolai as firing squad officer
- Bruno Corazzari as coalman
- Francesco Carnelutti as Cameriere Segreto

== Historical accuracy ==
Monsignor Hugh O'Flaherty was a real Irish-born priest and Vatican official, credited with saving 6,500 Jews and Allied war prisoners.

The portrayal of Pope Pius XII is notable. He "answers questions that the film hasn't even raised. The world, in fact, didn't raise the questions until the 1960s." Answering protests that came decades later, including by Rolf Hochhuth's play The Deputy and the writings of Hannah Arendt, the film wrestles with the role of the Holy See in the War at multiple points. During the conclusion of the film, Pope Pius XII tells O'Flaherty: 'In my heart I honor you'.

The character of General Max Helm was based on SS-Obergruppenführer Karl Wolff, who served in 1944 as the Supreme SS and Police Leader of Italy. The film was unable to use Wolff's real name, since the former SS general was still living when the film was in production; he died in 1984.

Herbert Kappler converted from Protestant to Catholic in 1949; however, that fact only became known in 1959.

Herbert Kappler was instrumental in carrying out the Ardeatine massacre, one of the worst World War II atrocities on Italian soil. His life imprisonment sentence was largely in relation to that crime. He was eventually transferred to a prison hospital on account of poor health. It was from there that he was smuggled out in a suitcase by his wife in 1977 (Kappler weighed less than 105 pounds at the time). He escaped to West Germany, where he died at age 70 in 1978.

Actor Christopher Plummer was 53 years old during the production of the film. Herbert Kappler was only 36 when he served as SS Security Chief in Rome.

== Awards ==
During the 35th Primetime Emmy Awards, the film was nominated in the categories of Outstanding Individual Achievement - graphic design and title sequences for Phil Norman, Outstanding Film Editing for a Limited Series or a Special for Benjamin Weissman and winning for Outstanding Film Sound Mixing for a Limited Series or a Special for Gordon L. Day, John Mitchell, Stanley A. Wetzel and Howard Wilmarth.
