= Robert Katz =

American novelist

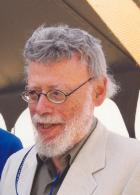
- Born: 27 June 1933; Brooklyn, New York, United States
- Died: 20 October 2010 (aged 77); Tuscany, Italy
- Occupations: Writer; novelist; screenwriter; journalist; non-fiction author; professor
- Spouse: Beverly Gerstel Katz(m. 1957)
- Children: Stephen Lee Katz, Jonathan Howard Katz And two grandchildren Rose Penelope Katz and Benjamin Jordan Katz

Robert Katz (27 June 1933 – 20 October 2010) was an American novelist, screenwriter, and non-fiction author.

== Biography ==
Katz was born in Brooklyn, New York, the son of Sidney and Helen Katz, née Holland, and married Beverly Gerstel on September 22, 1957. The couple had two sons: Stephen Lee Katz and Jonathan Howard Katz.

He studied at Brooklyn College 1951–53 and went on to be a photojournalist and writer at the United Hias Service, NYC 1953–57; at the American Cancer Society in New York (1958–63); and then at the United Nations in New York and Rome (1963–64). He was a freelance writer from 1964 until his death.

He fulfilled academic roles at numerous institutions, including being visiting professor of Investigative Journalism at the University of California, Santa Cruz (1986–92). Awarded an ongoing Guggenheim Fellowship in 1970, he had also been a fellow of Adlai E. Stevenson College, University of California during 1986 to 1992. He became a grantee of the American Council of Learned Societies in 1971 and a recipient of the Laceno d'Oro (best screenplay) award at the Neorealist Film Festival in Avellino, Italy (1983).

Katz was involved in a criminal-libel lawsuit in Italy over the contents of his book Death in Rome, in which he was charged with "defaming the memory of the Pope" Pius XII regarding the Ardeatine Massacre of 335 Italians, including 70 Jews, at the Ardeatine Caves in 1944. The book aroused international religious and political controversy; the book was made into the 1973 film Massacre in Rome starring Richard Burton. which brought the controversy to court, culminating in a two-year criminal trial. Katz was ultimately convicted and sentenced to fourteen months in prison for defaming the memory of Pope Pius XII. The verdict was overturned on appeal and later the case was dismissed by Italy's Supreme Court.

Katz lived for many years in Tuscany, Italy. He died October 20, 2010, in Montevarchi, Italy, as a result of complications from cancer surgery.

In February 2024 it was announced that Academy award nominee America Ferrera would star in and executive produce an Amazon Prime Video series based on the Katz' 1990 book Naked by the Window: The Fatal Marriage of Carl Andre and Ana Mendieta. The series will be scripted by Cherise Castro Smith and co-executive produced by Amazon MGM Studios and Plan B Entertainment.

== Non-fiction writings ==
- Death in Rome, New York: Macmillan Publishers, 1967.
- Black Sabbath: A Journey through a Crime against Humanity, Macmillan, 1969.
- The Fall of the House of Savoy, Macmillan, 1971.
- A Giant in the Earth, Stein & Day, 1973.
- Days of Wrath: The Ordeal of Aldo Moro, the Kidnapping, the Execution, the Aftermath, Doubleday, 1980. (Pulitzer Prize nomination 1981)
- Il caso Moro (with G. Ferrara and A. Balducci), Pironti, 1987.
- Love is Colder than Death: The Life and Times of Rainer Werner Fassbinder, Random House, 1987.
- Naked by the Window: The Fatal Marriage of Carl Andre and Ana Mendieta, Atlantic Monthly Press, 1990.
- Dossier Priebke, Rizzoli, 1997.
- The Battle for Rome: the Germans, the Allies, the Partisans and the Pope, September 1943-June 1944, Simon & Schuster, 2003.

== Novels ==
- The Cassandra Crossing, Ballantine, 1976.
- Ziggurat, Houghton, 1977.
- The Spoils of Ararat, Houghton, 1978.

== Filmography ==
- Massacre in Rome (1973) (book "Death in Rome") (screenplay)
- The Cassandra Crossing (1976) (screenplay) (story)
- The Salamander (1981) (writer)
- The Skin (1981) (screenplay)
- Kamikaze 1989 (1982) (writer)
- Dolce e selvaggio (1983) (English dialogue)
- The Moro Affair (1986) (book Days of Wrath) (screenplay)
- Blood Ties (1986) (story)
- Hotel Colonial (1987) (writer)
- The Plague (1992) (narration)
- The Contractor (2007) (V) (story)
