= Reinhard Kopps =

Nazi officer (1914–2001)

- Kopps in 1994
- Born: 29 September 1914; Hamburg, German Empire
- Died: 11 September 2001 (aged 86); Bariloche, Argentina
- Military career
- Allegiance: Nazi Germany
- Branch: Schutzstaffel

Reinhard Kopps (29 September 1914 – 11 September 2001) was an SS officer for the Nazi Party during World War II. Following the defeat of Germany in World War II, he helped Nazis escape to Argentina, finally fleeing there himself. Under the assumed name of Juan Mahler (sometimes spelled Maler), Kopps hid and lived by an assumed name in the small town of Bariloche in the Andes Mountains. Bariloche was also the home of Erich Priebke after World War II.

== Life ==
As an intelligence agent and anti-Freemasonry expert, Kopps was deployed to the Balkans and Hungary during the Nazi era . According to the NARA archives, Kopps joined the Nazi Party (NSDAP) in Hamburg on March 1, 1940, with membership number 7,524,143.

Allegedly, Kopps gave false papers to 25 Jews in October 1944 to save them from deportation to Auschwitz , and was therefore sentenced to death and persecuted by SD agents. He was apparently rescued by General Leo Rupnik, the president of the Nazi-created Slovenian satellite state. As a member of the Nazi secret service, he was arrested by the British in Klagenfurt in 1945. After a year, he escaped and bought false papers under the name Hans Mahler. He then went to Rome.

After World War II, Kopps became the most important assistant to the Nazi escape facilitator and Bishop Alois Hudal , enabling war criminals to flee to Argentina via the Ratline, also known as the Monastery Route. Kopps's task was to look after Nazis who sought the support of the Catholic Church. To this end, Kopps initially established contacts with Croatian and Hungarian clergy who also wanted to bring war criminals to safety. "Officially, Kopps was employed in the library of the Casa Generalizia of the German-dominated Salvatorian Order… This work provided Kopps with excellent cover for his Nazi escape activities, as he confessed decades later in his memoirs."

Kopp's integration into the Nazi escape network also involved close cooperation with Juan Perón's DAIE offices at Via Alberao 38 in Rome. He lived with German and Croatian war criminals who were being protected by Monsignor Karlo Petranović . "Petranović acted as a representative of auxilium and as Krunoslav Draganović's agent in the Port of Genoa. He was himself a war criminal: as a Ustaša captain, he had been a close associate of the local Ustaša leader in Ogulin, a district where approximately 2,000 Serbs were murdered during the war. Petranović had incited and organized these murderers; he also personally ordered the arrest and execution of 70 prominent Serbs."

Kopps also maintained close ties with Father Edoardo Dömöter of the San Antonio parish in Genoa. Dömöter signed Adolf Eichmann's application for a Red Cross passport . "Like Petranović, Siri, and Dragonovic, Dömöter also worked closely with Bishop Hudal."

Kopps worked closely with the former Italian officer Franz Ruffiengo, Draganović, the Argentine immigration office (DAIE), and later worked in Juan Perón's escape assistance office in Genoa. "In mid-1948, Kopps himself fled to Argentina, from where he maintained contact with Hudal and, under the name Juan Mahler, carried out extensive neo-Nazi propaganda activities."

Under his pseudonym, Juan Mahler, Kopps published writings after 1945 in which he esoterically glorified Hitler and Nazi ideology. He worked as an editor for the National Socialist newspaper Der Weg, which was circulated not only among Nazi refugees but also in Nazi circles in Europe. For a time, he was the South America correspondent for the Nazi-apologetic magazine Nation – Das politische Magazin für Deutsche.

Recently opened Nazi archives in 1994 enabled journalists and historians to research former officers and staff. The Simon Wiesenthal Center discovered his whereabouts. ABC News investigators followed up on known Nazi war criminals, convicted in absentia. Kopps was living in San Carlos de Bariloche, a small Argentinian town where numerous Nazi war criminals, such as Josef Schwammberger and Josef Mengele, were able to hide. On May 6, 1994, ABC reporter Sam Donaldson's news team surprised him with a camera crew on his doorstep. Eventually Kopps admitted that he was Reinhard Kopps, the former Nazi, and that he assisted Nazis to leave Germany and settle in Argentina. Panicked, Kopps asked the reporter to interview the "real" war criminals instead, revealing the location of SS-Hauptsturmführer Erich Priebke, which confirmed the ABC News' research. Priebke was soon arrested, and Kopps temporarily fled to Tierra del Fuego. The account was produced as an episode for ABC's Primetime Live, as well as for Nazi Hunters. Priebke had been a close associate of Herbert Kappler, the Gestapo chief in Rome, and had participated in the Ardeatine Massacre near Rome on March 24, 1944, in which 335 hostages were shot in retaliation of 33 SS soldiers being killed by a partisan bombing in Rome's Via Rasella attack. Erich Priebke's escape papers passed through Kopps' hands. When Priebke applied for a passport, he was able to present a guarantee from the Pontifical Relief Commission ( PCA ).

Uki Goñi writes: “There is no doubt that these churchmen [referring to the PCA] closely coordinated their actions with Nazi agents like Reinhard Kopps. It is also clear that their projects were enthusiastically supported by the officials in Perón’s DAIE who greeted people with ‘Heil Hitler’.”

== Literature ==
- Uki Goñi : The Real Odessa , original English edition, Granta Publications, London 2002, revised edition Granta Books July 9, 2003, German: Odessa: The True Story. Escape Aid for Nazi War Criminals . Translated from the English by Theo Bruns and Stefanie Graefe. 2nd edition. Assoziation A, Berlin 2007, ISBN 978-3-935936-40-8 .
- Gerald Steinacher : Nazis on the Run. How War Criminals Escaped Overseas via Italy . Studien-Verlag, Innsbruck et al. 2008, ISBN 978-3-7065-4026-1 ( Innsbruck Research on Contemporary History 26. Also: Innsbruck, Univ., Habil.-Schr., 2007).
