= Florian Abrahamowicz =

Austrian priest (born 1961)

Florian "Floriano" Abrahamowicz (born 7 April 1961) is an Austrian sedevacantist priest of the Congregation of Mary Immaculate Queen. He was formerly the Prior of the Society of St. Pius X in northeastern Italy, but was expelled from the Society in February 2009 for expressing sedevacantist views.

== Early life and ordination ==
Florian Abrahamowicz was born in Vienna, where his father, Alexander Abrahamowicz (born 10 September 1926), was a Protestant pastor of Armenian background. Alexander's father, Jakob, had moved to Vienna from Pojorâta in Romania before Alexander's birth. Because of his mother, Maria Teresa Amantea, an Italian pianist, Florian Abrahamowicz also has Italian citizenship.

Florian is one of five siblings, three of whom became Roman Catholic priests. The other two priests are not linked with the Society of St. Pius X or any traditionalist groups. One, Dom Johannes Paul Abrahamowicz, was Prior (underabbot) of the Benedictine Abbey of Saint Paul Outside the Walls from 2005 to 2009. He was webmaster of the ATLAS of the Benedictine Order OSB International until January 2008. At Saint Paul outside the Walls, he composed the official hymn of the Pauline Year, and gave interviews on ecumenical aspects of the Year. In December 2009, he returned to his monastery in Austria.

An aunt, Elfriede Huber-Abrahamowicz (1922–2001), wrote poetry, stories, novels and philosophical treatises and lectured on the philosophy of feminism in Zürich.

== Views ==
=== Political views ===
In 2001, Abrahamowicz spoke at a ceremony in honour of those who died in support of Benito Mussolini's Italian Social Republic, fighting, he said, for motherland and religion, "innocent victims because their murderers belonged to no legitimate army", a reference to the partisans whom he described as "poor ignorant fellows fighting for what Pius XI called the perverse sect of communism".

In 2006, he said in a television interview that he viewed Erich Priebke, a German SS officer convicted of war crimes for a 1944 massacre in Rome, in which 335 Italian civilians were killed in reprisal for the deaths of 33 German soldiers, not as an "executioner", but rather a soldier who acted "with regret and a heavy heart".

He is seen as unofficial chaplain of Italy's regional party Lega Nord. In 2007, Umberto Bossi, the leader of the party, accepted his invitation to his celebration of a Tridentine Mass and said there were affinities between his party and the followers of Archbishop Marcel Lefebvre.

In 2008, Cardinal Dionigi Tettamanzi of Milan deplored the lack of worship facilities for Muslims in that city. In December 2008, speaking on the weekly programme of Mario Borghezio's Padania Association on Radio Padania Libera (Radio Free Padania), Abrahamowicz attacked Cardinal Tettamanzi's views on the matter. He called on his listeners to put no trust in the Cardinal Archbishop, whom he called "the latest example of the infiltrators who try in every revolution—the English, the French, the Bolshevik and, now, the globalist—to subvert the Church from inside". He added: "Do not think that Tettamanzi represents the left wing of a Church led by the conservative Ratzinger, because in reality it is the whole Conciliar Church that is allied to those powerful forces that by Islamizing Europe aim at world domination in accordance with an anti-Christian design".

=== Religious views ===
On 5 February 2009, the day after the publication of a note by the Holy See's Secretariat of State stating that "an indispensable condition for any future recognition of the Society of Saint Pius X is their full recognition of Vatican Council II and of the Magisterium of Popes John XXIII, Paul VI, John Paul I, John Paul II, and Benedict XVI", Abrahamowicz, speaking on the Canale Italia television network declared: "The Second Vatican Council was worse than a heresy [...] Saint Pius X tells us that modernism is the cloaca maxima of heresies. [...] So I say that the Second Vatican Council is a cloaca maxima".

Shortly before, on 25 January 2009, the Sunday after the publication of the decree lifting, at their request, the excommunication of the four bishops of the Society of St. Pius X, he preached a sermon denying that there had been any excommunication to lift, since Lefebvre's consecration of four bishops on 30 June 1988 was a meritorious act, not a crime. He quoted Archbishop Lefebvre's words: "Those who excommunicate us have long since been excommunicated. Why? Because they are modernists! Being of modernist spirit, they have created a Church that is in conformity with the spirit of the world. This modernism is what was condemned by Saint Pius X, patron of the Society. This last holy Pope condemned the modernists and excommunicated them. All these spirits, modernists that they are, are excommunicated by Saint Pius X. Those persons imbued with modernist principles are those who have excommunicated us, while themselves excommunicated by Saint Pius X." He then added: "For the person who gave orders for the insulting decree of 'lifting' is Joseph Ratzinger, who continues unperturbed the modernist ecumenism of the Second Vatican Council, which he calls "a beacon we cannot renounce", thus incurring the excommunication Saint Pius X issued against the modernists. An excommunicate lifts a non-existent censure!.

On 15 March 2010, after a Mass in Treviso, he publicly burned a volume of Vatican II documents.

=== Holocaust denial controversy ===
On 29 January 2009, amid the controversy over Bishop Richard Williamson's denial of the Holocaust, Abrahamowicz said he was not sure the Nazis had used gas chambers for anything other than disinfection, claimed that the number of six million Jews killed was derived from a number used by the head of the German Jewish community without knowledge of the facts, complained that the Holocaust had wrongly been exalted, by Jews in particular, above other genocides and said that the people of Israel "initially were the people of God, ... then became the people of deicide, and ... at the end of time will reconvert to Jesus Christ."

== Expulsion from SSPX ==
On 5 February 2009, the Italian chapter of the Society of St. Pius X issued a notification that from the following day Abrahamowicz was expelled from the Society "for serious disciplinary reasons": "Father Florian Abrahamowicz has for some time been expressing opinions differing from the official views of the Society of St. Pius X. The painful decision to expel him has become necessary in order to avoid having the image of the Society of St. Pius X further distorted with consequent harm to its work at the service of the Church."

== Sedevacantism ==
Following his expulsion from the SSPX, Abrahamowicz joined the Congregation of Mary Immaculate Queen (CMRI), an American traditionalist Catholic group expousing sedevacantist views. In 2016 Bishop Mark Pivarunas of the CMRI administered the sacrament of confirmation to 20 people in Paese, during a Mass presided by Abrahamowicz. The Diocese of Treviso declared the confirmations to be "valid but illicit".
