= Nuala Considine =

Irish crossword compiler

- in 2017 (fair use only)
- Born: Aisling Fionnuala Kiernan; 10 October 1927; London
- Died: 24 July 2018 (aged 90)
- Occupation: Crossword compiler
- Writing career
- Years active: 1946–2018

Nuala Considine (10 October 1927 – 24 July 2018) was an Irish woman considered to be the world's most prolific crossword compiler. She produced crossword puzzles for newspapers and magazines across Europe and the United States, including The Irish Times, The Telegraph, The Spectator, The Financial Times, Woman's Realm, The Washington Post and New Scientist. Her first crossword was published when she was 18, and she continued to produce them by hand until shortly before her death, aged 90. She used the noms de plume Excalibur and Alaun to create cryptic puzzles with names such as The Toughie and The Stinker.

== Early life ==
Considine was born Aisling Fionnuala "Nuala" Máire Kiernan to Dr Thomas J Kiernan, a diplomat, and Delia Murphy, a renowned folk singer, in London on 10 October 1927. She had a brother, Colm, and two sisters, Blon and Orla. Her father was one of the Irish Free State’s earliest diplomats, and was first secretary at the Irish High Commission in London when she was born. He was later appointed Minister Plenipotentiary to the Holy See during World War II and she went to school in Rome, becoming a fluent speaker of Italian, French and Spanish. She studied piano at the Accademia di Santa Cecilia. Her father later became Ireland's first ambassador to Australia, though Considine did not follow her family to Canberra.

Her first career was a stewardess with Irish airline Aer Lingus. There she met ex-RAF Battle of Britain pilot Brian Considine, from Limerick, who was working as a pilot. They married in 1948 and Considine was obliged to resign due to Irish laws which meant married women could not hold jobs in the civil service or semi-State companies. Brian Considine also resigned and the couple moved to London.

Her career as a crossword setter began when she and her husband sent in a joint puzzle to The Irish Times and it was published.

== Career ==
In London, Considine joined the Fleet Street press agency Morley Adams (now Press Association) in 1955. She did a number of jobs, including writing horoscopes, theatre reviews, a column on how to achieve a happy marriage, and crosswords, which she devised in pencil. For seven decades, her puzzles appeared in publications across Europe and the United States, including The Telegraph, The Spectator, The Financial Times, The Washington Post and New Scientist.

She started contributing five puzzles a week to the now defunct Daily Sketch. She set five puzzles a week for a decade in The Daily Express, a Friday crossword for The Evening Standard and a giant crossword, called "The Stinker", every weekend for The Daily Mail for a quarter of a century. She also contributed to a large number of magazines, including Women's Realm, Amateur Gardening, and New Scientist. Considine was not a scientist and had to learn a range of new words and terms for the New Scientist puzzle.

Her work for the London Telegraph group began in 1986. She set more than 1,000 puzzles for The Daily Telegraph and from 1992, more than 800 puzzles for The Sunday Telegraph. In 2008, a more challenging puzzle, "The Toughie" was launched and Considine, then over 80, set more than 100 of these.

Her trademark clues were "droll and concise" with "deceptive brevity". She avoided obscure answers or words and her mantra was "Rub out, rub out, rub out!" This did not stop her puzzles being challenging. An example, from her 100th Toughie, is: “Ram home (5–3)” – Answer: “Sheep-pen”.

Considine never used computers to compile her grids and wrote them by hand, then either faxed them or scanned and emailed them to her editors. She is thought to have compiled more newspaper crosswords than anyone in history.

== Later life and death ==
Considine's husband Brian died in 1996. Phil McNeill, the Telegraph's crossword editor when Nuala was in her eighties, recalled that: “Compiling is a solitary occupation, and she missed Brian terribly. She split her time between central London and San Diego, California, as they had done together, and when she was in London we would meet for afternoon tea. Nuala had done some photographic modelling in her youth, and she would arrive exuding old-style glamour, a tiny, slim figure who looked as if a puff of wind could blow her away. She had a wicked sense of humour and was fantastic company.”

She continued to produce an "astonishing" output up until weeks before her death. Even then she admitted: “I’ve stopped work now, but you know, as I fall asleep I am still writing crossword clues in my head.” She died of pancreatic cancer on 24 July 2018. At the time of her death, Considine still had crosswords awaiting publication.
