= Delia Murphy =

Irish singer (1902–1971)

Delia Murphy

Delia Murphy Kiernan (16 February 1902 – 11 February 1971) was an Irish singer and collector of Irish ballads. She recorded several 78 rpm records in the 1930s, 1940s and 1950s. In 1962 she recorded her only LP, The Queen of Connemara, for Irish Prestige Records, New York, on the cover of which her name appears alongside the LP title.

During World War II, she aided Vatican official, Monsignor Hugh O'Flaherty, in saving the lives of 6,500 Allied soldiers and Jews, while her husband, Dr. Thomas J. Kiernan, was the Irish Ambassador in Rome from 1941–46.

== Early life ==
She was born in Ardroe, Claremorris, County Mayo, Ireland to a well-off family. Her father, John Murphy, from nearby Hollymount, made his fortune in the Klondike Gold Rush. While in America, he married Ann Fanning from Roscrea, County Tipperary. They returned to Ireland in 1901 and purchased the large Mount Jennings Estate in Roundfort. John encouraged Delia's interest in Irish traditional music from a young age. He also allowed Irish travellers to camp on the estate. According to her own account, she learned her first ballads at their campfires.

Delia was educated at Presentation Convent, Tuam; Dominican College, Dublin; and University College Galway (UCG), where she graduated with a Bachelor of Commerce degree. In UCG she met Dr. Thomas J. Kiernan, and they married in 1924, on her 22nd birthday. They had a son, Colm, and three daughters, Blon, Nuala and Orla.

Kiernan joined the Irish diplomatic service, where his first posting was to London. While there Murphy sang at many venues including many gatherings of Irish emigrants and became quite well-known. In 1939 she recorded The Blackbird, The Spinning Wheel and Three Lovely Lassies for His Master's Voice.

== World War II ==
In 1941 Kiernan was appointed Irish Minister Plenipotentiary to the Holy See in Rome. The Irish legation was the only English-speaking legation to remain open after the United States entered World War II. In April 1941, during the Belfast Blitz, Murphy saved many lives by convincing people to remain inside the city’s Ulster Hall, where she sang throughout the air raid. Murphy became one of those who assisted Hugh O'Flaherty (the "Vatican pimpernel") in hiding Jews and escaped allied soldiers from the Nazis. In 1943, when Italy changed sides, many escaped POWs were helped by the legation to leave Italy. When German troops began occupying Rome, Murphy smuggled Allied soldiers out of the city by hiding them beneath rugs in the back of a car.

In 1946 she was awarded the rank of Dame Commander of the Equestrian Order of the Holy Sepulchre.

== Later life ==
Kiernan later served as Irish High Commissioner and later first Ambassador in Australia, and later to West Germany, Canada, and the United States. In 1961, while she was living in Ottawa, Murphy made the recording of "The Queen of Connemara" produced by Kenny Goldstein. Murphy and Kiernan bought a farmhouse in Jasper, Ontario, near the Rideau Canal where she spent most of her time, even after Kiernan was posted to Washington. Tom Kiernan died in December 1967.

== Death ==
By 1969 Murphy's health was in decline. In November of that year she sold her farmhouse in Canada and returned to Ireland. She lived in a cottage in Strawberry Beds, Chapelizod, County Dublin. Murphy died of a massive heart attack on 11 February 1971, five days before her 69th birthday. She had recorded upwards of 100 songs.

== Sources ==
- O'Hara, Aidan (1997). I'll live till I die. Leitrim: Drumlin Publications. ISBN 1-873437-17-X. Archived from the original on 3 March 2016.
