= Egidio Galea =

Maltese Roman Catholic priest

The Reverend Egidio Galea OSA MBE
- Church: Catholic Church

Personal details
- Born: 5 May 1918 Birgu, Malta
- Died: 3 January 2005 (aged 86) Birgu, Malta
- Buried: St. Lawrence Cemetery, Birgu
- Education: Pontifical Gregorian University (STD)

Egidio Galea OSA MBE (5 May 1918 – 3 January 2005) was a Maltese Augustinian Roman Catholic priest, missionary, and educator, and a significant figure in the Catholic resistance to Nazism in Italy during World War II. He was a close aide to the Irish priest Hugh O'Flaherty.

== Biography ==
=== Early life and education ===
Galea was born on 5 May 1918 in Birgu, Malta. He studied at the Dockyard School in Senglea and later attended the Boys' Secondary School in Valletta. In 1933, Galea entered the Order of Saint Augustine, and after several years studying philosophy, he was sent to Rome in 1937 to study theology at the Pontifical Gregorian University, where he earned his Doctor of Sacred Theology.

=== World War II activities ===
It was during his time at the Pontifical Gregorian University that Galea met Hugh O'Flaherty, an Irish priest who worked in Rome as a Vatican diplomat. O'Flaherty was working to rescue and hide or help escape thousands of Jews and Allied soldiers in Nazi-occupied Italy. O'Flaherty needed help in this endeavor, and Galea became one of his closest aides. During the course of World War II, O'Flaherty and his aides were responsible for saving more than 6,500 Allied soldiers and Jews. After the liberation, Galea was made a member of the Order of the British Empire.

=== Later life ===
In 1945, Galea returned to Malta, where he taught Scripture to Augustinian seminarians. Between 1955 and 1961, he was sent to Tunisia, where he worked as a missionary and also taught Latin. In 1961, he returned to Malta, and between 1967 and 1971, he served as the Augustinian provincial superior. Between 1984 and 1990, he was a lecturer at the Augustinian Institute at the University of Malta. Throughout the years, he authored several articles and books, mainly discussing Augustine of Hippo, his life, and the Augustinian Order.

Galea died on 3 January 2005 at the age of 86. He is buried at the Santa Maria Addolorata Cemetery in Paola.
