= Hotel Colonial =

- Theatrical release poster
- Directed by: Cinzia Th. Torrini
- Screenplay by: Enzo Monteleone; Cinzia Th. Torrini; Robert Katz; Ira Barmak
- Story by: Enzo Monteleone
- Produced by: Ira Barmak
- Starring: John Savage; Rachel Ward; Massimo Troisi; Robert Duvall
- Cinematography: Giuseppe Rotunno
- Edited by: Nino Baragli
- Music by: Pino Donaggio
- Production companies: Hemdale Film Corporation; Legeis Theatrical
- Distributed by: Orion Pictures (United States); Columbia Pictures (Italy)
- Release dates: January 3, 1987 (Italy); September 18, 1987 (USA)
- Running time: 104 minutes
- Countries: United States; Italy
- Languages: English; Italian

Hotel Colonial is a 1987 adventure film directed by Cinzia Th. Torrini, and written by Enzo Monteleone, Cinzia Th. Torrini, Robert Katz and Ira Barmak. The film stars John Savage, Rachel Ward, Massimo Troisi, Robert Duvall and Anna Galiena. The film was released on September 18, 1987, by Orion Pictures.

== Plot ==
Marco Venieri receives word that his brother Luca, an ex-terrorist turned state's evidence, has killed himself in Colombia. Marco takes the journey to Colombia only to find a country permeated with poverty, corruption, racism and crime.

== Cast ==
- John Savage as Marco Venieri
  - Daniel Sommer as Young Marco Venieri
- Rachel Ward as Irene Costa
- Massimo Troisi as Werner
- Robert Duvall as Roberto Carrasco
- Anna Galiena as Francesca Venieri
- Claudio Báez as Anderson
- Zaide Silvia Gutiérrez as Linda
- Tariq Hager as Luca Venieri
- Isela Díaz as Indian Child
- Demián Bichir as Young Hotel Clerk
- Jorge Abraham as Man in Jail 1
- René Pereyra as Man in Jail 2
- Carlos De Leon as Old Man in Jail
- René Barrera as Bookmaker at Cock Fight
- Carlos Romano as Bartender in Nuevo Venicio
- Roberto Sosa as Street Kid
- Honorato Magaloni as Bookmaker with Soccer Team
- Roger Bronte as Television Newscaster
- Federico Gonzáles as Captain Santillana
- Loló Navarro as Woman on Bus
- Cesar Sanvicente as Taxi Driver
- Edmundo Barahona as Embassy Receptionist
- Milbugo Trevino as Clerk at Hotel Estacion
- Manuel Fierro as Man at Pier
- Teresa Mendoza as Prostitute
- Araceli Jurado as Girl at Bed
- Juan Hernández as Clerk at Hotel Pacifico
- Pedro Pucheta as Bus Driver
- Daniel Santa Lucía as Mendoza
- Josh Lukins as Film Narrator
