= Hugh O'Flaherty =

Irish Catholic priest (1898–1963)

The Right Reverend Hugh Monsignor O'Flaherty CBE
- Church: Catholic Church

Orders
- Ordination: 20 December 1925

Personal details
- Born: 28 February 1898 Lisrobin, Kiskeam, County Cork, Ireland
- Died: 30 October 1963 (aged 65) Cahersiveen, County Kerry, Ireland
- Buried: Daniel O'Connell Memorial Church
- Education: Mungret College

Hugh Monsignor O'Flaherty CBE (28 February 1898 – 30 October 1963) was an Irish Catholic priest, a senior official of the Roman Curia and a significant figure in the Catholic resistance to Nazism. During the Second World War, O'Flaherty was responsible for saving 6,500 Allied soldiers and Jews. His ability to evade the traps set by the German Gestapo and Sicherheitsdienst (SD) Chief Herbert Kappler earned him the nickname "The Scarlet Pimpernel of the Vatican".

After the war, he was named a papal domestic prelate by Pope Pius XII and served as notary of the Holy Office. He worked alongside and closely assisted Cardinal Alfredo Ottaviani until 1960. Prior to being incapacitated by a stroke in that same year, Monsignor O'Flaherty was about to be promoted by Pope John XXIII to papal nuncio to Tanganyika. He returned to his native Ireland, where he died in 1963.

Despite O'Flaherty and Delia Murphy's joint role in helping to save more than 5,000 Jewish lives through their Rome Escape Line network during the Holocaust in Italy, Anglo-Irish and Protestant nurse Mary Elmes still remains the only Irish person honoured as a Righteous Among the Nations by Yad Vashem.

== Early life ==
Shortly after Hugh O'Flaherty's birth in Lisrobin, Kiskeam, County Cork, his parents, James and Margaret, moved to Killarney. The family lived on the golf course, and James O'Flaherty worked there as a steward. By his late teens, young O'Flaherty had a scratch handicap and a scholarship to a teacher training college.

However, in 1918, he enrolled at Mungret College, a Jesuit college in County Limerick dedicated to preparing young men for missionary priesthood. Normally, students ranged from 14 to 18 years. When O'Flaherty came in, he was a little older than most of the students, at about 20. The college allowed for some older people to come in if they had been accepted by a bishop who would pay for them.

O'Flaherty's sponsor was the Bishop of Cape Town, Bernard Cornelius O'Riley, in whose diocese he expected to be posted after ordination, a major step for a young man who had never set foot outside of Munster. When O'Flaherty was in Mungret, the Irish War for Independence was ongoing. He was posted to Rome in 1922 to finish his studies and was ordained on 20 December 1925. He never joined his diocese, however, but he stayed to work for the Holy See and served as a Vatican diplomat in Egypt, Haiti, Santo Domingo, and Czechoslovakia. In 1934, he was appointed a papal chamberlain with the title of Monsignor. He was originally ascribed to the Sacred Congregation De Propaganda Fide through which, in collaboration with the Cardinal Prefect, Pietro Fumasoni Biondi, and the Pro-Rector of the Pontifical Urban College De Propaganda Fide, Saverio Maria Paventi di San Bonaventura, he began to establish a network of assistants with whom he managed to save approximately 6,500 people such as civilians, military personnel and Jews, whom he lodged in Vatican extraterritorial residences and religious institutes during the German occupation of Rome in the Second World War. That activity, which was carried out while he evaded repeated traps by Herbert Kappler and Pietro Koch, resulted in O'Flaherty being nicknamed "The Scarlet Pimpernel of the Vatican".

== World War II ==
In the early years of World War II, O'Flaherty toured prisoner-of-war (POW) camps in Italy and tried to find out about prisoners who had been reported missing in action. If he found them alive, he tried to reassure their families through Radio Vatican.

When Mussolini was removed from power by King Victor Emmanuel III in 1943, thousands of Allied prisoners-of-war were either released or escaped after being deliberately left unguarded by their Italian Royal Army guards, but when Germany imposed an occupation over Italy, they were in danger of recapture. Some of them, remembering visits by O'Flaherty, reached Rome and asked him for help. Others went to the Irish embassy to the Holy See, the only English-speaking embassy to remain open in Rome during the war. Delia Murphy, who was the wife of Thomas J. Kiernan, the Irish ambassador (and in her day, she was a well-known traditional singer of Irish ballads), was one of those who helped O'Flaherty.

O'Flaherty did not wait for permission from his superiors. He recruited the help of other priests (including two young New Zealanders, Fathers Owen Snedden and John Flanagan), two agents working for the Free French, François de Vial and Yves Debroise, communists and a Swiss count. One of his aides was British Major Sam Derry, an escapee. Derry along with the British officers and escaped POWs Lieutenants Furman and Simpson, and Captain Byrnes, a Canadian, were responsible for the security and operational organisation. O'Flaherty also kept contact with Sir D'Arcy Osborne, British Ambassador to the Holy See, and his butler, John May, whom O'Flaherty described as "a genius... the most magnificent scrounger". O'Flaherty and his allies concealed 4,000 escapees, mainly Allied soldiers and Jews, in flats, farms and convents. Among those sheltered was one Ines Gistron and a Jewish friend whom O'Flaherty placed in a pensione run by Canadian nuns at Monteverde (Rome), where they were given false identification.

One of the first hideouts was beside the local SS headquarters. O'Flaherty and Derry co-ordinated all of that from his room at the Collegio Teutonico. When outside the Vatican, O'Flaherty wore various disguises. The Gestapo eventually found out first that the leader of the network was a priest and then learned his identity; but could not arrest him inside the Vatican. When the secretly anti-Nazi German ambassador to the Holy See, Baron Ernst von Weizsäcker, violated German Foreign Office orders and revealed that to O'Flaherty, he began to meet his contacts on the stairs of St. Peter's Basilica. Multiple SS conspiracies to kidnap or assassinate O'Flaherty, even on Vatican soil, failed.

Obersturmbannführer Herbert Kappler, the head of the SS Sicherheitsdienst and Gestapo in Rome, learned of O'Flaherty's actions and ordered a white line painted on the pavement at the opening of St. Peter's Square, which signified the border between Vatican City and Occupied Italy, and vowed that the priest would be killed if he crossed it. Italian Fascist Pietro Koch, the head of the Banda Koch, a special task force charged with hunting down partisans and rounding up deportees for the Gestapo, often boasted of his plans to personally torture and execute O'Flaherty if he were ever captured by Koch's unit.

Adding to the dangers O'Flaherty faced was a mole inside the Curia: former Russicum seminarian Alexander Kurtna, a convert to the Russian Greek Catholic Church from Estonian Orthodoxy. Following his expulsion by the Russicum's rector in 1940, Kurtna served, with only one interruption between 1940 and 1944, as a translator for the Vatican's Congregation for the Eastern Churches. At the same time, he spied for the Soviet NKVD, with devastating results for many underground priests and faithful on Soviet soil. Kurtna, who was always loyal to the USSR, only started also spying for Nazi Germany in 1943 because his handler, Herbert Kappler, threatened to send Kurtna and his wife to a concentration camp otherwise. Kurtna, however, betrayed Kappler by recruiting the latter's female secretary into stealing the codebooks from Kappler's office shortly before the liberation of Rome and passing them to the Soviets. Following the liberation of the city, Kurtna found the NKVD to be ungrateful masters and ended up as a political prisoner in the Norillag region of the Soviet Gulag.

Several others, including priests, nuns and laypeople, worked in secret with O'Flaherty and even hid refugees in their own homes around Rome. Among them were the Augustinian Maltese Fathers Egidio Galea, Aurelio Borg and Ugolino Gatt, the Dutch Augustinian Father Anselmus Musters and Brother Robert Pace of the Brothers of Christian Schools. Another person who contributed significantly to the operation was Maltese national Chetta Chevalier, who hid refugees in her house with her children and escaped detection. Jewish religious services were conducted on the Jewish Sabbath and the High Holy Days in the Basilica di San Clemente, which was under the diplomatic protection of the Irish Foreign Office, beneath a painting of Tobias.

When the Allies arrived in Rome in June 1944, 6,425 of the escapees were still alive. O'Flaherty demanded that German POWs be treated properly as well. He took a plane to South Africa to inspect the conditions for Italian POWs and to Jerusalem to visit Jewish refugees. Of the 9,700 Jews in Rome, only 1,007 had been captured and shipped to Auschwitz. The rest were hidden, over 5,000 of them by the Church, 300 in Castel Gandolfo, 200 or 400 (estimates vary) as "members" of the Palatine Guard and some 1,500 in monasteries, convents and colleges. The remaining 3,700 were hidden in private homes.

During the liberation of Rome, O'Flaherty and Derry's organisation was caring for 3,925 escapees and men who had evaded arrest. Of them, 1,695 were British, 896 South African, 429 Soviet, 425 Greek and 185 American. The remainder were from a further 20 nations. That does not include Jews and sundry other men and women who were in O'Flaherty's personal care.

O´Flaherty later flew to Palestine and aided in the resettlement of Jewish Holocaust survivors.

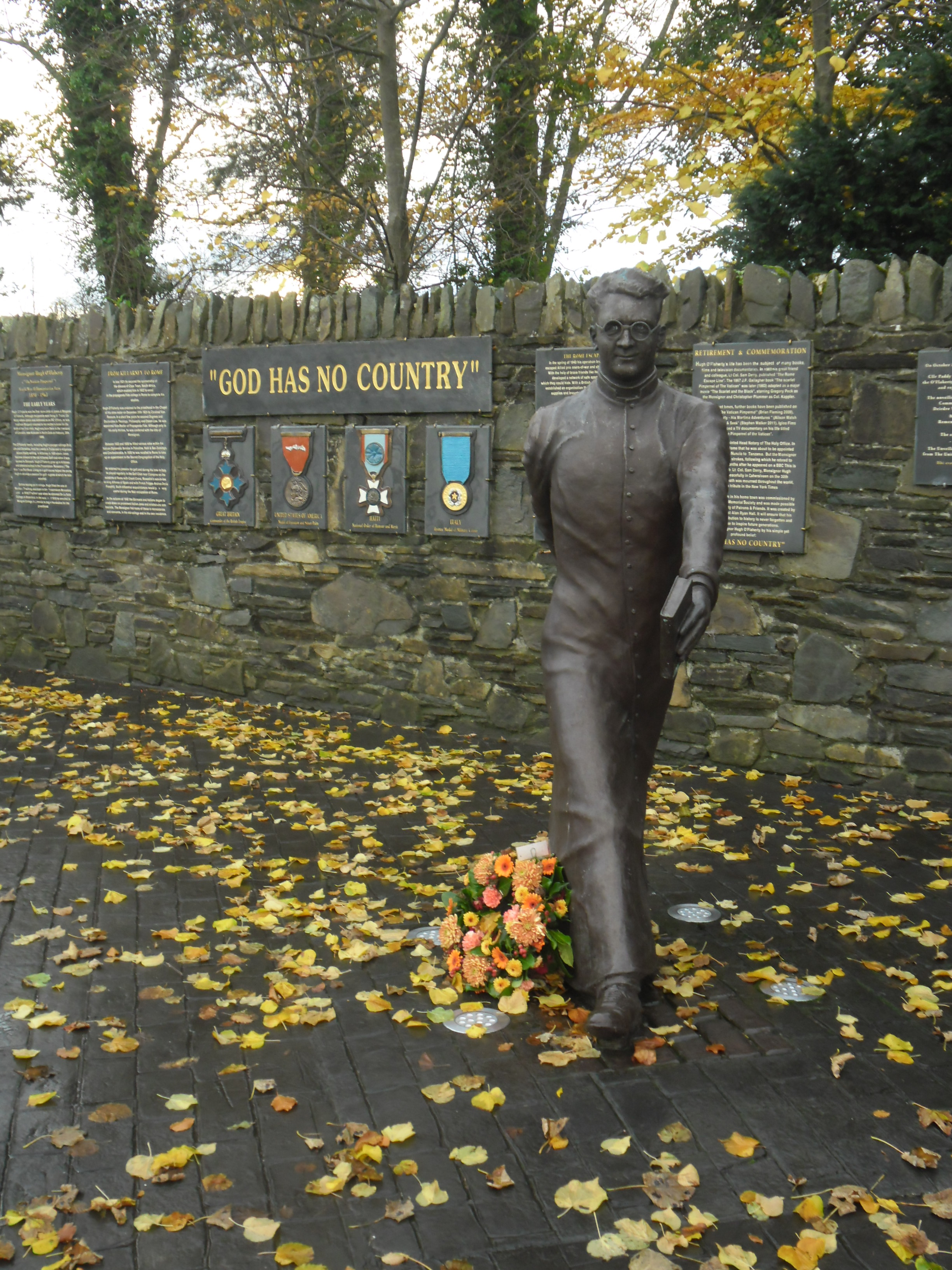
Memorial to Monsignor O'Flaherty located in Killarney, Ireland

== Postwar ==
After the war, O'Flaherty received a number of awards, including appointment as a Commander of the Order of the British Empire (CBE) "for services to the Forces in Italy" and the American Medal of Freedom with Silver Palm. He was also honoured by Canada and Australia. He refused to use the lifetime pension that Italy had given to him. In 1954, he was promoted to domestic prelate. In the 1950s, the Chaplet of the Divine Mercy, in the form proposed by Mary Faustina Kowalska, who was later canonised by John Paul II, was under a ban from the Vatican. It was O'Flaherty who, as notary, signed the document that notified Catholics of the ban. He was the first Irishman named Notary of the Holy Office.

O'Flaherty regularly visited his old nemesis, Herbert Kappler (the former SS chief in Rome), in prison month after month and was Kappler's only visitor. In 1959, Kappler converted to Catholicism and was baptised by O'Flaherty.

In 1960, O'Flaherty suffered a serious stroke during Mass and was forced to return to Ireland. Shortly before his first stroke in 1960, he was about to be confirmed as the papal nuncio to Tanganyika (now Tanzania). He moved to Cahersiveen to live with his sister, at whose home he died on 30 October 1963, aged 65.

He was buried in the cemetery of the Daniel O'Connell Memorial Church in Cahersiveen. There is a monument in Killarney Town and a grove of trees dedicated to his memory in the Killarney National Park. Some sources incorrectly state that in 2003, he became the first Irish person honoured as Righteous Among the Nations by the State of Israel. However, according to the official list, this is not the case and Mary Elmes remains the only Irish person so honoured. An application to have him added to the rolls was being prepared in 2017.

== Dramatization ==
O'Flaherty was portrayed by Gregory Peck in the 1983 television film The Scarlet and the Black, which follows the exploits of O'Flaherty from the German occupation of Rome to its liberation by the Allies.

He was also the second principal character in a radio play by Robin Glendinning on Kappler's time seeking asylum in the Vatican, titled The Scarlet Pimpernel of the Vatican, which was first broadcast on 30 November 2006 on Radio 4, with Wolf Kahler as Kappler.

Killarney-born actor and playwright Donal Courtney penned a new one-man play entitled God Has No Country, which he premièred in Killarney as part of the Hugh O'Flaherty memorial celebrations for three nights in October 2013. Courtney portrays O'Flaherty during the wartime years in German-occupied Rome; the story is told from O'Flaherty's point of view and is a study of the torment and difficulty in the decisions he undertook in his fight for justice.

In 2023, Joseph O'Connor published My Father's House, a novel based on the exploits of O'Flaherty and his resistance group.

There is a follow up book, a novel, as well, also by Joseph O'Connor, titled “Ghosts of Rome”

=== Television ===
The Irish-language television station TG4 broadcast a 51-minute documentary on O'Flaherty in 2008. It is available (in mixed Irish/English with English subtitles) on a region-free DVD entitled The Pimpernel of the Vatican – The Amazing Story of Monsignor Hugh O'Flaherty.

== Awards and decorations ==
Monsignor O'Flaherty's commonly known awards and decorations.
