= Guido Buffarini Guidi =

Italian Army officer and politician

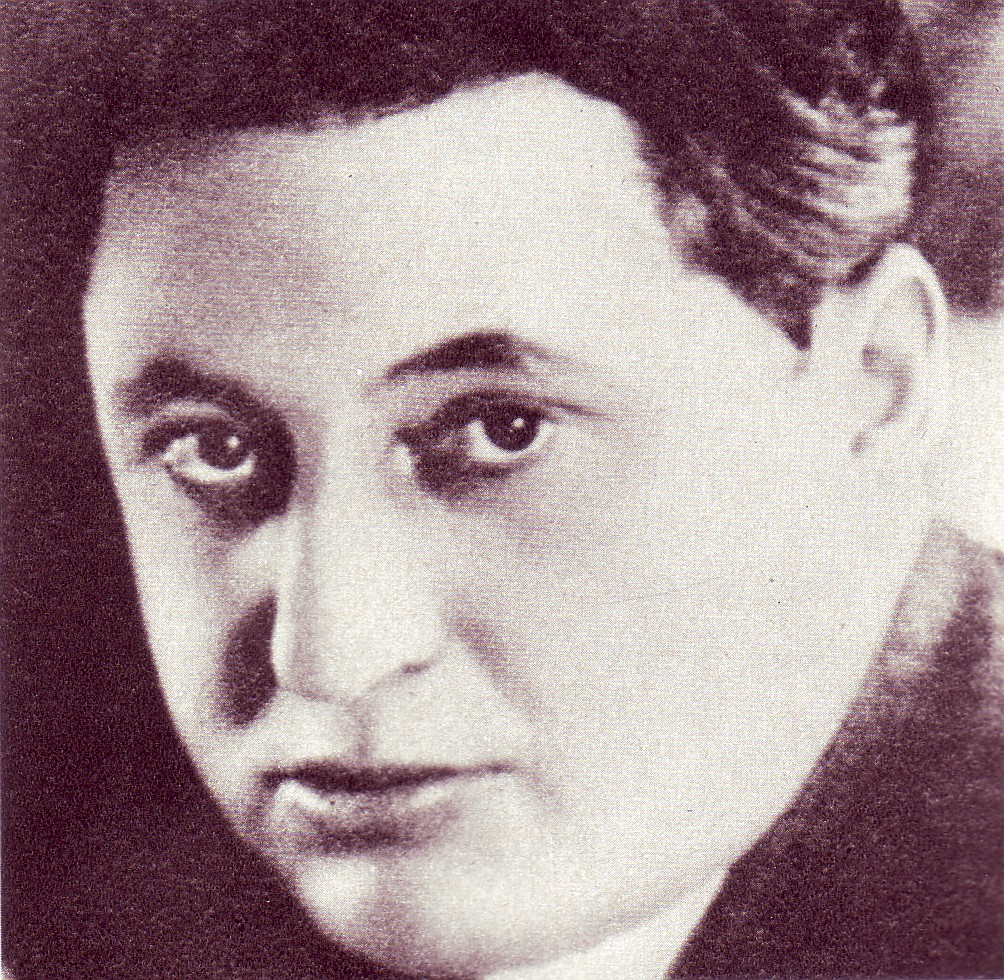
- Young Guido Buffarini

Minister of the Interior of the Italian Social Republic
- In office 23 September 1943 – 21 February 1945
- Preceded by: Office established
- Succeeded by: Paolo Zerbino

Personal details
- Born: 17 August 1895 Pisa, Kingdom of Italy
- Died: 10 July 1945 (age 49) Milan, Kingdom of Italy
- Party: National Fascist Party (1921–43); Republican Fascist Party (1943–45)
- Height: 1.55 m (5 ft 1 in)
- Education: University of Pisa
- Occupation: Politician

Military service
- Allegiance: Kingdom of Italy
- Branch/service: Royal Italian Army
- Years of service: 1914-23
- Rank: Captain
- Battles/wars: World War I

Guido Buffarini Guidi (17 August 1895 – 10 July 1945) was an Italian army officer and politician, and was executed for war atrocities during the Italian Civil War in 1945.

== Early life and education ==
Buffarini Guidi was born in Pisa in 1895. When Italy entered World War I, he volunteered in an artillery regiment. He was promoted to rank of captain in 1917, and remained on active duty in the Italian Army until 1923 – in the meantime, he earned his bachelor's degree in law from the University of Pisa in March 1920.

== World War II ==
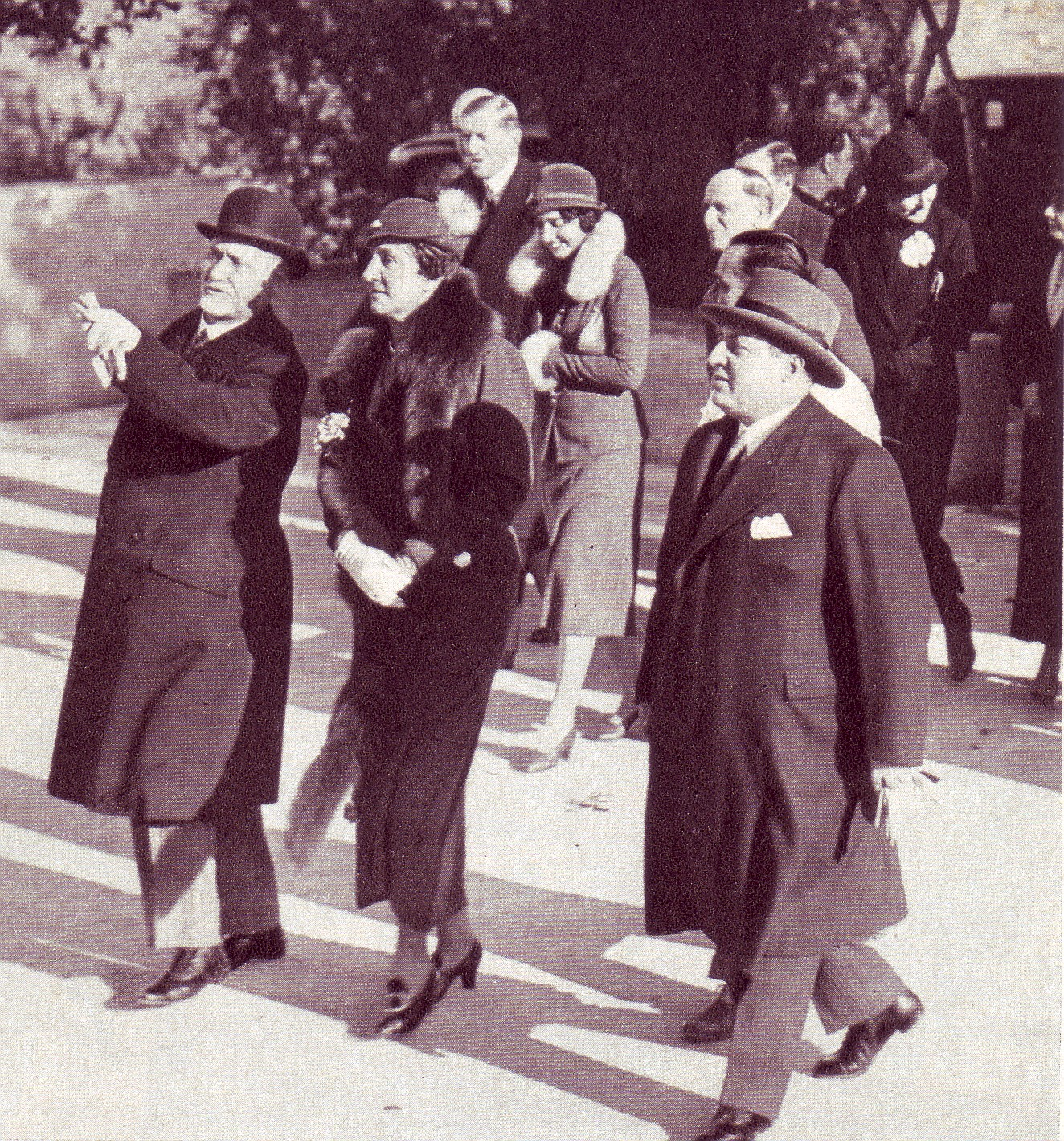
Buffarini Guidi (right) in Fara Sabina with Queen Elena of Italy, November 1933.

After leaving the army, with the rank of lieutenant colonel, he became active in Fascist circles, and joined the National Fascist Party (PNF). A mayor of Pisa in April 1923, Buffarini Guidi headed the local Party hierarchy from 1924 (his notoriety being increased by his career as a lawyer). He rose to become honorary Consul of the MVSN Blackshirts - the voluntary militia after the March on Rome.

In May 1933, he was appointed to be Undersecretary Minister of Interior, and forged an alliance with Galeazzo Ciano - opposing the Party bureaucracy, creating several secret services, and attempting to lessen the effects of Antisemitic legislation passed by the regime. Nevertheless, (and unlike Ciano), on 25 July 1943, Buffarini Guidi voted in favor of Benito Mussolini during Dino Grandi's attempt to have the latter deposed and get Italy to sign a peace with the Allies. As a reward, after Nazi Germany intervened and rescued Mussolini in September, Guido Buffarini Guidi was appointed Minister of the Interior of the new Italian Social Republic (established by Nazis in Northern Italy). Seen as extremely avaricious, he was distrusted even by most of his cabinet colleagues.

On 30 November 1943, Guidi issued RSI Police Order No. 5, which required the Italian police to arrest all Jews except for those born of mixed marriages and deport them to concentration camps. Ten days after issuing the order he amended it to exclude the gravely ill and those over the age of 70. The order is regarded as a major turning point in the Italian Holocaust.

=== Arrest ===
Near the end of the Republic's life, in February 1945, Mussolini dismissed Buffarini Guidi from office. After a failed attempt to escape to Switzerland, he was arrested by the partisans on 26 April. Like any other Italian Fascist prosecuted for engaging in the Italian Civil War, he was tried under Italian law since the laws of war at the time had no provisions dealing with non-international armed conflict (NIAC). He was sentenced to death for atrocities committed in the Italian Civil War by an Extraordinary Court of Justice in Milan. He was executed by firing squad on 10 July, having tried (like French collaborator Pierre Laval) and survived a suicide attempt while in captivity.

While in prison, Guidi offered to reveal to the Allies compromising letters exchanged between Churchill and Mussolini during the war in exchange for his release; he was unsuccessful.

== Appearances in film ==
In the 1973 film Massacre in Rome, Guido Guidi is portrayed by Italian actor Guidarino Guidi.
