= Guidarino Guidi =

Italian film actor and director

Guidarino Guidi (1922–2003) was an Italian film actor and director. Most of Guidi's film work took place in the 1960s and early 70s with nine acting credits to his name in addition to several Assistant Director and Casting Director billets. His single directorial role is credited as a segment of the 1961 film Cronache del '22.

Guidi's limited appearance in American cinema took place in 1973 when he played the Fascist Interior Minister Guido Buffarini Guidi (coincidentally having the same family name as his character) in the film Massacre in Rome. He thereafter retired from film work, and died in 2003.

== Filmography ==
Year	Title	Role	Notes
1957	A Farewell to Arms	Civilian Doctor	Uncredited
1966	Kiss the Girls and Make Them Die		
1968	Danger: Diabolik	Frank	Uncredited
1970	Waterloo	Fat Man	Uncredited
1972	Rosina Fumo viene in città... per farsi il corredo	don Tibaldi	
1972	Avanti!	Maitre D'	
1973	Massacre in Rome	Guido Buffarini-Guidi	
1974	We All Loved Each Other So Much	Himself	
1976	L'Italia s'è rotta	Il vigile urbano romano	
1976	E tanta paura		(final film role)
