= Donal Courtney (actor) =

Irish actor (1970–2022)

- Born: 1970; Killarney, County Kerry, Ireland
- Died: 14 May 2022 (aged 52); Castleknock, Dublin, Ireland
- Occupations: Actor, director, playwright
- Years active: 1991–2022

Anthony "Donie" Courtney (1970 – 14 May 2022) was an Irish actor, director and playwright.

== Biography ==
Born in Killarney, County Kerry, Courtney was a graduate of the Gaiety School of Acting in 1991. He is credited with introducing Michael Fassbender to acting and established an acting school with him, West End House School of Arts in Killarney, shortly before his death. Courtney appeared in numerous television productions, including Fair City and The Tudors, but is especially associated with his portrayal of Monsignor Hugh O'Flaherty in his play God has no Country.

Among his final creative projects was the play Memento Mori, created in partnership with Carthage College's Theatre Department as the 14th installment of their New Play Initiative. It premiered at Carthage in Kenosha, Wisconsin, USA in 2022 before traveling to the region 3 Kennedy Center American College Theater Festival in Flint, Michigan in 2023. The production then traveled to Smock Alley Theatre in Dublin before completing its run at West End House.

== Personal life and death ==
Married with two children, Courtney was the son of the long-standing Killarney town councillor and tourism director Michael Courtney, a former director of elections for Fine Gael in Kerry South.

He died after a brief illness on 14 May 2022, aged 52.
