= Golden telephone =

Rotary telephone made of, or plated with, gold

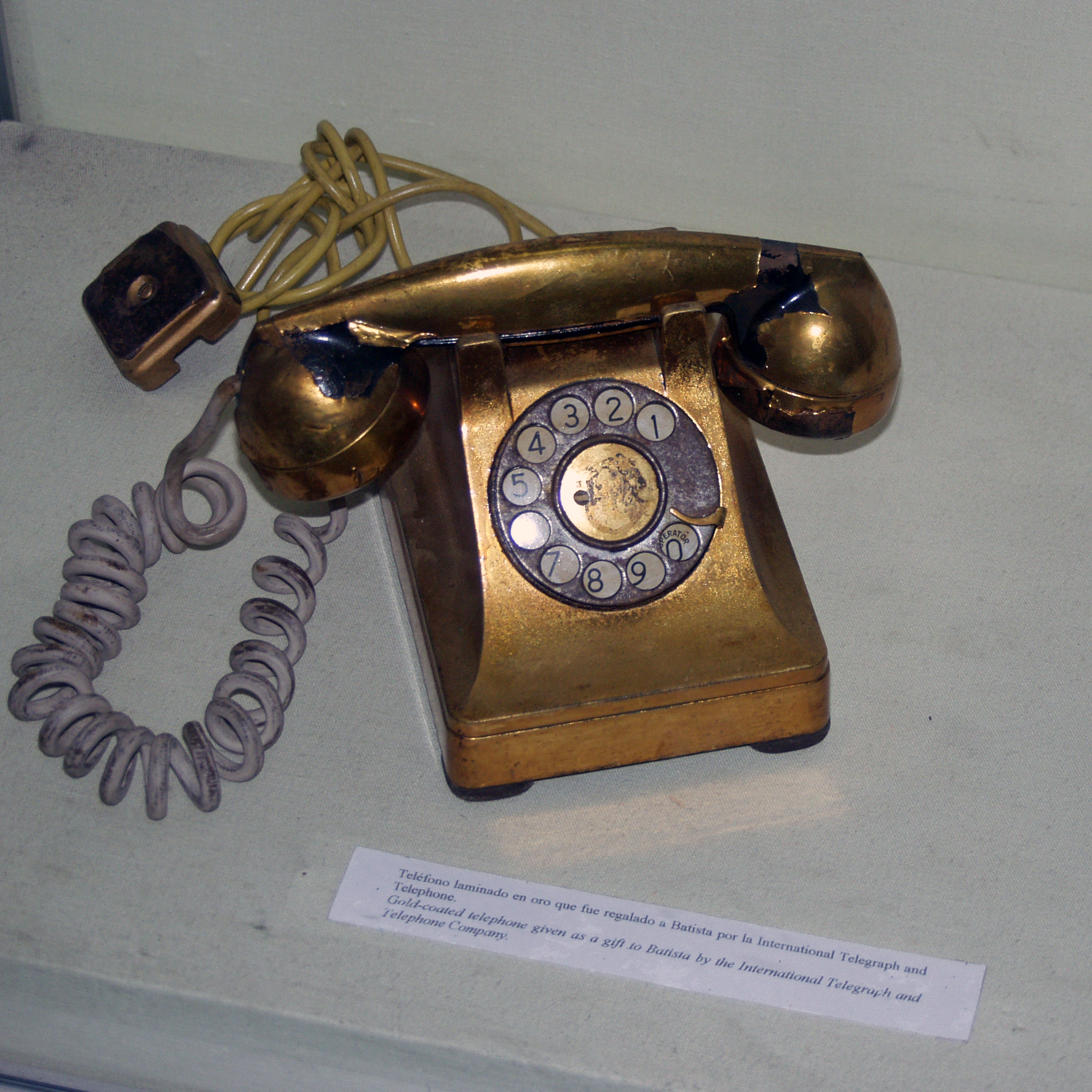
A golden telephone presented in 1957 to Cuban dictator Fulgencio Batista.

A golden telephone is a rotary telephone made of or plated with gold. It is popularly associated with opulent decadence, representing power, wealth and elitism. Golden telephone sets were notably presented to Pope Pius XI in 1930 and to the Cuban dictator Fulgencio Batista in 1957.

== The Vatican ==
In 1930, the newly created Vatican City was connected to the international telephone network via the International Telephone and Telegraph (ITT), which had recently installed a new telephone exchange. For that occasion, the Catholic Church in the United States presented a golden telephone to Pope Pius XI. The golden phone was used until the end of Pope John XXIII's pontificate in 1963. Since then, the Pope has used a standard phone in 'papal' white.

== Cuba ==
During an award ceremony with US Ambassador Arthur Gardner, a ceremonial golden telephone was presented to the Cuban dictator, Fulgencio Batista, in 1957. The instrument is currently on display in Museum of the Revolution, formerly Batista's presidential palace, in Havana.

== In popular culture ==
A golden telephone appeared in The Godfather Part II as the film depicts Cuban dictator Batista receiving it as a gift from the telephone company United Telephone and Telegraph (presumably intended to represent International Telephone and Telegraph) as thanks for repealing long time price controls on telecommunications in Cuba. Batista is hosting a meeting when he is presented with the telephone, then passes it around for all to see. Various business heads and Mafia figures are seen playing with it, with the exception of Michael Corleone, who briefly admires it, and Hyman Roth, who passes it to the next man without so much as glancing at it.

In Oliver Stone's The Doors, Jim Morrison meets Andy Warhol at a party. The camera focuses on a golden telephone, which Warhol offers to Morrison saying: "Somebody gave me this telephone... I think it was Edie... yeah, it was Edie... and she said I could talk to God with it, but uh... I don't have anything to say... so here... (giving Jim the phone) this is for you... now you can talk to God." Morrison accepts the telephone and later gives it to a homeless person.

The symbol is also popular in various award ceremonies as a supposed edifice of prominence. Golden telephone awards include Springwire and Overthinkingit.
