= Pietro Koch =

Italian police officer (1918–1945)

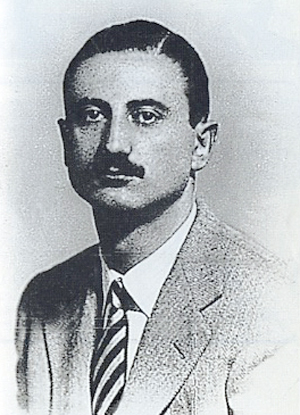
- Born: 18 August 1918; Benevento, Italy
- Died: 5 June 1945 (aged 26); Forte Bravetta, Rome, Italy
- Cause of death: Execution by firing squad
- Military career
- Allegiance: Fascist Italy; Italian Social Republic
- Branch: Royal Italian Army
- Unit: 2nd Regiment "Granatieri di Sardegna"; Special Service of Republican Police

Pietro Koch (18 August 1918 – 5 June 1945) was an Italian soldier and police officer who lead the Banda Koch (lit. "Koch Gang"), a group notorious for its anti-partisan activity in the Republic of Salo.

== Early life and career ==
Koch was born in Benevento in 1918. He was the son of Otto Koch, a former Imperial German Navy officer-turned-wine merchant, and his Italian wife Olga Politi. The family moved to Rome during the 1930s, where Koch attended law school until joining the Royal Italian Army in 1938. He served as a lieutenant in the Grenadiers where he was unpopular with his fellow soldiers and was dismissed from the army in 1939 for insulting a superior officer.

Koch then lived between Rome and Perugia, working as a realtor. In 1940, he married Enza Gregori, but the marriage broke down within a few months after he had an affair with a 16-year-old girl. In October 1942, he was investigated by authorities for "significant fraudulent activity."

In the spring of 1943, Koch was recalled to military service with the 2nd Regiment "Granatieri di Sardegna". He saw continuous service until the armistice of 3 September 1943, after which he moved to Florence.

== Anti-partisan activity ==
Settling in the Social Republic in the north of Italy, Koch joined the Special Service of Republican Police led by Tullio Tamburini. In January 1944, he established the Banda Koch as a special task force charged with hunting down partisans and rounding up deportees, including Jews, for the Germans. Koch came under the protection of SS-Obersturmbannführer Herbert Kappler, SD chief in Koch's base of Rome, and as such had a free hand to employ whatever tactics he saw fit with Banda Koch, which soon became a by-word for cruelty and violence. Koch was given his own prisons and torture chambers and continued his activity in Florence and then Milan following the fall of Rome to the Allies. Along with police chief Pietro Caruso, who was independently involved in the killing of partisans, Koch was behind hundreds of deaths; the Social Republic government even ordered an amnesty for political prisoners not charged with murder out of fear that Koch would have them killed.

== Arrest and execution ==
Mussolini eventually had his close ally Renzo Montagna arrest Koch for his excesses in October 1944. He soon fell into Allied hands, was tried by an Italian tribunal and was convicted of six charges only under Italian law at the High Court since the laws of war at the time had no provisions dealing with non-international armed conflict (NIAC). He was executed at Rome's Forte Bravetta aged 26.
