= Chetta Chevalier =

Maltese woman who rescued Jews during WWII

Chetta Chevalier BEM
- Born: Henrietta Scerri; 2 April 1901; Sliema, Crown Colony of Malta
- Died: 9 July 1973 (aged 72); Malta
- Burial place: Addolorata Cemetery, Paola, Malta
- Occupations: Spy; nurse; housewife

Henrietta Chetta Chevalier BEM (2 April 1901 – 9 July 1973) was a Maltese woman of British nationality resident in Rome and a critical node in Monsignor Hugh O'Flaherty's "Rome Escape Line" network operating in the Vatican during World War II. Her third-floor flat on the Via Imperia was used as a depot for supplies, and to lodge escapees fleeing the Fascist regimes of Europe. She was known within the organization as "Mrs. M." The provenance of her nom de guerre — whether this was a reference to her home island of Malta, her mother's maiden name, or another factor — is unknown.

== Life ==
Chevalier was born Henrietta Scerri to Emmanuel Scerri and his wife Maria née Mamo in Sliema, Malta. She married Thomas Chevalier on 15 May 1920 at the Church of Our Lady of the Sacred Heart in Sliema. The couple lived in Rome, where Mr. Chevalier worked as an agent for British travel company Thomas Cook & Sons, and had several children. After the death of her husband and the imprisonment of one of her sons in 1939, the British widow found herself stuck in Mussolini's fascist state and responsible for the welfare of her children and elderly mother. Recruited into O'Flaherty's network, Chevalier essentially gave O'Flaherty carte blanche to use her apartment as a storehouse and safehouse for people fleeing fascism. Despite several close scrapes — including one which one of her daughters, Gemma, hid from Chevalier — and being under constant surveillance by Hitler's Sicherheitsdienst, Chevalier and her family continued their clandestine activities under constant risk of death until being evacuated by O'Flaherty's network one by one to a farm on the outskirts of the city where they lived out the rest of the war in hiding themselves.

In 1945, Chevalier was awarded a British Empire Medal (BEM) for her extraordinary efforts to offer sanctuary to those in need. Her efforts are credited with directly offering assistance to 4,000 people during the war.

Chevalier passed away on her native Malta on 9 July 1973, and is buried at the Santa Maria Addolorata Cemetery. A memorial garden has been planted in her honour at the Malta Aviation Museum and was opened on 24 November 2012.
