= Herbert Kappler =

SS officer (1907–1978)

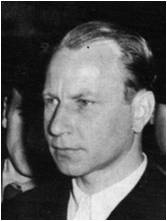
- Kappler in custody, 1946
- Born: 23 September 1907; Stuttgart, Kingdom of Württemberg, German Empire
- Died: 9 February 1978 (aged 70); Soltau, Lower Saxony, West Germany
- Military career
- Allegiance: Nazi Germany
- Branch: Schutzstaffel
- Service years: 1932–1945
- Rank: SS-Obersturmbannführer
- Units: Gestapo
- Commands: Kommandeur der Sicherheitspolizei und des SD in Rome
- Criminal information
- Convictions: Italian Military Tribunal; War crimes (Ardeatine massacre)
- Penalty: Life imprisonment

Gustav Adolph Herbert Kappler (23 September 1907 – 9 February 1978) was a key German SS functionary and war criminal during the Nazi era. He served as the commander of German security police and security services (Sicherheitspolizei and SD) in Rome during the Second World War and was responsible for the Ardeatine massacre. Following the end of the war, Kappler stood trial in Italy and was sentenced to life imprisonment. He escaped from a prison hospital with the help of his wife shortly before his death in West Germany in 1978.

== Early life ==
Kappler was born to a middle-class family in Stuttgart in what was still the German Empire. He joined the Nazi Party on 1 August 1931 and joined the SS in 1933. In January 1936, he was assigned to duty at the Gestapo main office in Stuttgart.

In 1938, during the Anschluss, Kappler supervised the mass deportations of Austrian Jews as part of the Holocaust in Austria. Kappler was posted to Rome as head of the Sicherheitsdienst (SD) and, from the beginning of the Second World War, he cooperated closely with the Italian police.

== Chief of Police in occupied Rome ==
In retaliation for the armistice between Italy and the Allies on 8 September 1943, the German military occupied Rome and Kappler, with the rank of SS-Obersturmbannführer, was appointed local Commander of the Security Police and Security Service (Kommandeur der Sicherheitspolizei und des SD) in charge of all SS security police and intelligence units deployed in Rome.

Kappler was immediately put in charge of implementing the Holocaust in Italy in both Rome and Lazio; in his first action, 1,023 Roman Jews were rounded up and deported to Auschwitz; where only 16 survived. He later arranged the deportation of a further 993 Roman Jews, nearly all of whom also were murdered in the gas chambers. As part of the latter operation, Kappler successfully extorted 45.5 kilograms (100 lb) of gold from the Jews of Rome, which Kappler later alleged was an attempt to prevent the deportations.

By early 1944, Kappler was the highest representative of the Reich Security Main Office in Rome and answered directly to both the military governor, Generalleutnant of the Luftwaffe Kurt Mälzer, as well as to the SS chain of command through Befehlshaber der Sicherheitspolizei und des SD SS-Brigadeführer Wilhelm Harster, to the Supreme SS and Police Leader of Italy (HöSSPF), SS-Obergruppenführer Karl Wolff. Kappler came into direct conflict with the neutral Vatican under Pope Pius XII, which Kappler correctly believed was harbouring escaped Allied POWs, members of the Italian Resistance, and Jews. A particularly detested adversary of Kappler's was Irish Monsignor Hugh O'Flaherty of the Sacred Congregation De Propaganda Fide. The Monsignor's activities covertly assisting Jews and other fugitives led both Kappler and his Italian colleague Pietro Koch to repeatedly, and vainly, plot O'Flaherty's kidnapping, torture, and summary execution.

Meanwhile, Kappler's moles inside the Vatican included an Estonian national and former Byzantine Rite seminarian from the Russicum named Aleksander Kurtna, who worked from 1940 until 1944 as a translator for the Vatican's Congregation for the Eastern Churches. During those same years, Kurtna covertly spied for the Soviet Union, with devastating results for the many underground priests and faithful whose names he passed to the NKVD. Kurtna, who was always loyal to the USSR, only started to also spy for Nazi Germany in 1943 because his new handler, Kappler, repeatedly threatened to otherwise send Kurtna and his wife to a concentration camp. Kurtna, however, turned the tables on Kappler by stealing the top-secret Sicherheitsdienst codebooks from his office during the chaos that surrounded the Liberation of Rome. Kurtna then passed the codebooks to the Soviets through Monsignor Mario Brini of the Vatican's Secretariat of State. Ironically, Kurtna's Soviet masters failed to appreciate or reward his loyalty. Kurtna was seen in 1948 by Fr. Walter Ciszek as a fellow political prisoner in the Gulag complex located 300 km above the Arctic Circle and known as Norillag. Kurtna was released in 1954 and died in Tallinn in 1983.

Kappler organised the Ardeatine massacre, in which 335 Italian civilians were killed on 24 March 1944 in response to a direct order from Adolf Hitler to "kill 10 Italians for each German," in retaliation for an attack by the Italian Resistance that had resulted in the deaths of 33 men of the SS Police Regiment Bozen's garrison in Rome.

== Criminal conviction ==
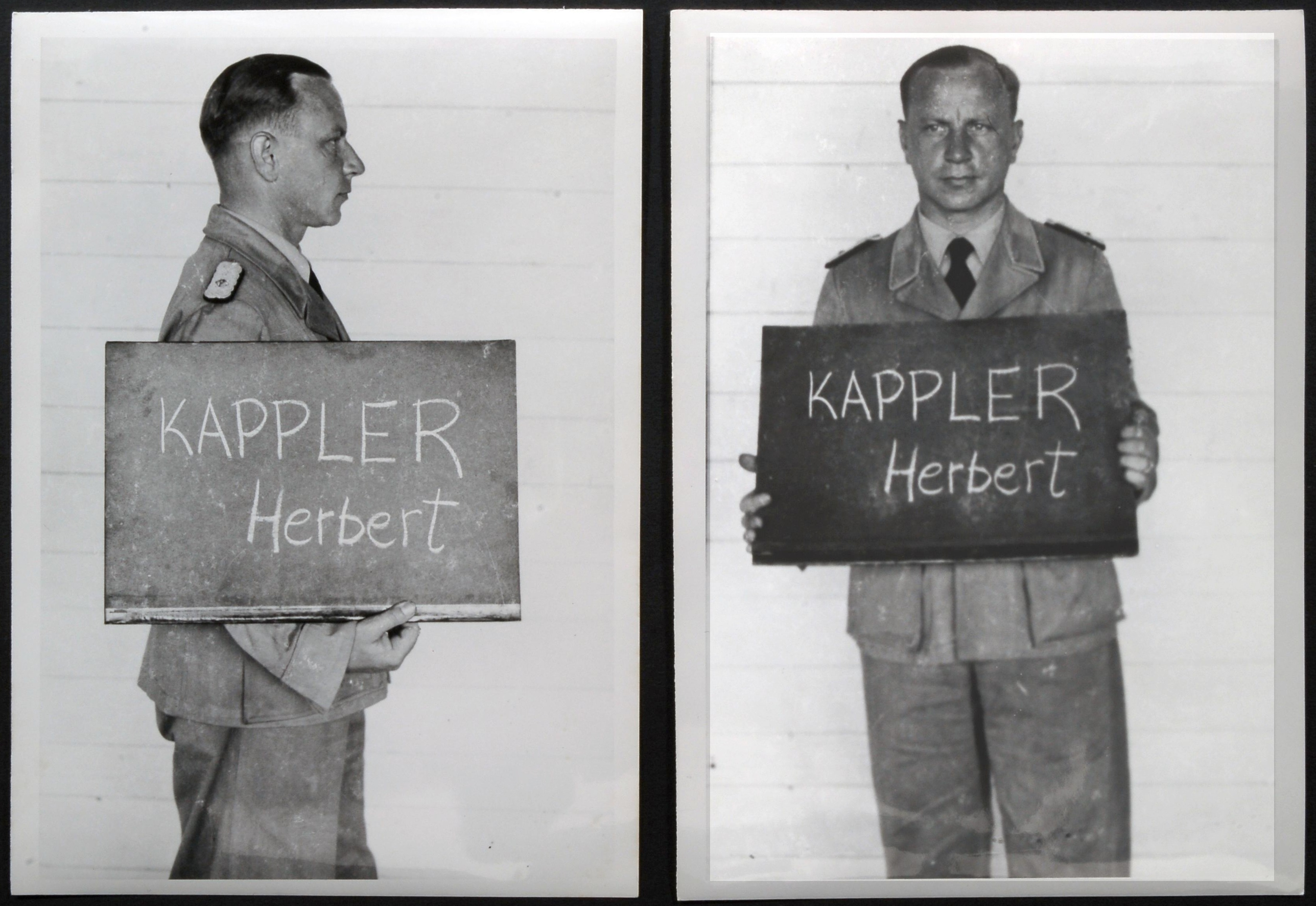
Kappler in Italy on 9 May 1945

Kappler was arrested by British authorities in 1945, turned over to the Italian government in 1947, and tried the following year. Kappler's second-in-command in Rome, SS-Captain Erich Priebke, managed to escape to Argentina and was not extradited to Italy to face trial over his own role in the Ardeatine Caves Massacre until 1996.

In July 1948, Kappler was tried by an Italian Army military tribunal and, on 20 July, was sentenced to life imprisonment, with the stipulation that the first four years were to be served in solitary confinement. He would be held in the Gaeta military prison. On 25 October 1952, Italy's Supreme Military Tribunal rejected Kappler's appeal and reaffirmed the life sentence. Kappler's first wife divorced him while he was serving his sentence. In 1972, he married Anneliese Kappler, a nurse with whom he had carried on a lengthy correspondence, in a prison wedding ceremony. By this time, Kappler had converted to Catholicism, due to the influence of his war-time enemy, Monsignor Hugh O'Flaherty, who often visited him in prison and with whom Kappler often discussed literature and religion.

In 1975, at the age of sixty-eight, Kappler was diagnosed with terminal cancer. Appeals by both his wife and the West German government for compassionate release were denied by Italian authorities but did earn him a transfer to a hospital in 1976. Due to Kappler's deteriorating condition and his wife's nursing skills, Anneliese Kappler was allowed almost unlimited access to him. On a visit in August 1977, she carried him out in a large suitcase (Kappler weighed about 47 kg (104 lb) at the time) and escaped to West Germany, assisted by an apparently unwitting Carabinieri member.

Despite demands that Kappler be returned to Italy, the West German authorities refused to extradite him and did not prosecute him for any further war crimes, reportedly owing to his ill-health. Vittorio Lattanzio resigned from his position as Minister of Defence in the aftermath of the escape. Six months after his escape, Kappler died at home in Soltau, on 9 February 1978, aged 70.

== In popular culture ==
In the 1973 feature film Massacre in Rome, which deals with the Ardeatine massacre, Kappler was portrayed by actor Richard Burton. Christopher Plummer portrayed Kappler in the 1983 TV film The Scarlet and The Black, which details Kappler's interactions with Monsignor Hugh O'Flaherty until Kappler's capture by Allies in 1944. The film is based on the book The Scarlet Pimpernel of the Vatican, by J.P. Gallagher, published in 1968.

Kappler's time in prison and the friendship with his former enemy Monsignor O'Flaherty born of the Monsignor's frequent visits to that prison cell, are dramatised in the radio play The Scarlet Pimpernel of the Vatican, by Robin Glendinning. The radio play was first broadcast on 30 November 2006 on UK BBC Radio 4. It was later performed live under the name Kingfishers Catch Fire.

== See also ==
- Military history of Italy during World War II
