= Erich Priebke =

German SS police commander (1913–2013)

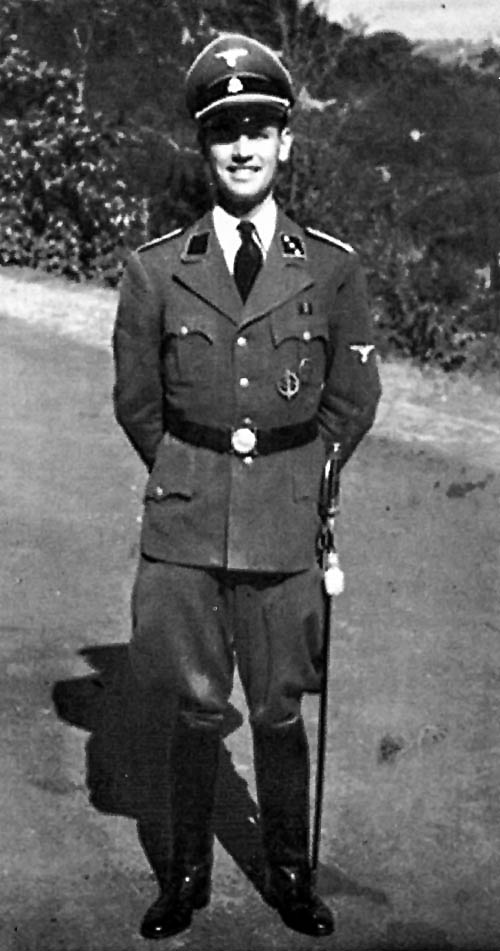
- Priebke on duty, 1940s
- Born: 29 July 1913; Hennigsdorf, German Empire
- Died: 11 October 2013 (aged 100); Rome, Italy
- Military career
- Allegiance: Nazi Germany
- Branch: Schutzstaffel
- Rank: Hauptsturmführer
- Units: Allgemeine SS; Gestapo

Erich Priebke (29 July 1913 – 11 October 2013) was a German mid-level Schutzstaffel (SS) commander in the Sicherheitspolizei (SiPo) of Nazi Germany. In 1996, he was convicted of war crimes in Italy for commanding the unit which was responsible for the Ardeatine massacre in Rome on 24 March 1944 in which 335 Italian civilians were killed in retaliation for a partisan attack that killed 33 men of the German SS Police Regiment Bozen. Priebke was one of the men held responsible for this mass execution. After the end of World War II in Europe, he fled to Argentina, where he lived for almost 50 years.

In 1991, Priebke's participation in the Rome massacre was denounced in Esteban Buch's book El pintor de la Suiza Argentina. In 1994, 50 years after the massacre, Priebke felt he could then talk about the incident and was interviewed by American ABC News reporter Sam Donaldson. This caused outrage among people who had not forgotten the incident and led to his extradition to Italy and a trial which lasted more than four years.

== Early life ==
Priebke was born on 29 July 1913, at Hennigsdorf, which was then in the Kingdom of Prussia. Little is known of his early life but Priebke told interviewers that his parents died when he was young and that he was reared mainly by an uncle before earning a living as a waiter in Berlin, at The Savoy Hotel, London, and on the Italian Riviera. Priebke married Alicia Stoll; the couple had two sons: Jorge, born in 1940 and Ingo, born in 1942.

== Service to the Schutzstaffel ==
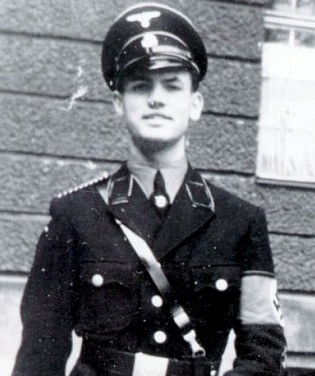
Priebke as a Schütze in the Allgemeine SS, 1936

From 1936, he worked for the Waffen-SS and later for the Gestapo as an interpreter, and because of his knowledge of Italian, he was based in Rome beginning in 1941. While there, he worked under Obersturmbannführer Herbert Kappler, who reportedly delegated relations with the Holy See to him.

=== Fosse Ardeatine massacre ===
The massacre of the Fosse Ardeatine took place in Italy during World War II. On 23 March 1944, 32 German personnel of the SS Police Regiment Bozen were killed after the Italian Resistance set off a bomb and attacked the SS men with firearms and grenades while they were marching along Via Rasella in Rome; another German police officer later died of his wounds, bringing the total dead to 33. This attack was led by the Patriotic Action Groups or Gruppi di Azione Patriottica (GAP).

Adolf Hitler is reported, but never confirmed, to have ordered that within 24 hours, ten condemned Italians were to be shot for each dead German. Commander Kappler in Rome quickly compiled a list of 320 prisoners to be killed. Kappler voluntarily added ten more names to the list when the 33rd German died after the partisan attack. The total number of people executed at the Fosse Ardeatine was 335, mostly Italian. The largest cohesive group among those executed was the members of Bandiera Rossa (Red Flag), a dissident-communist military resistance group, along with more than 70 Jews.

On 24 March, led by SS officers Priebke and Karl Hass, the victims were killed inside the Ardeatine caves in groups of five. They were led into the caves with their hands tied behind their backs and then shot in the neck. Many were forced to kneel down over the bodies of those who had already been killed. During the killings, it was found that a mistake had been made and that five additional people who were not on the "ten to one" list had been brought up to the caves. Priebke was responsible for the list, and his complicity in those 5 additional killings ruled out any possible justification for his behaviour on the basis of "obedience to official orders." As a result, Priebke's trial strongly focused on these extra killings.

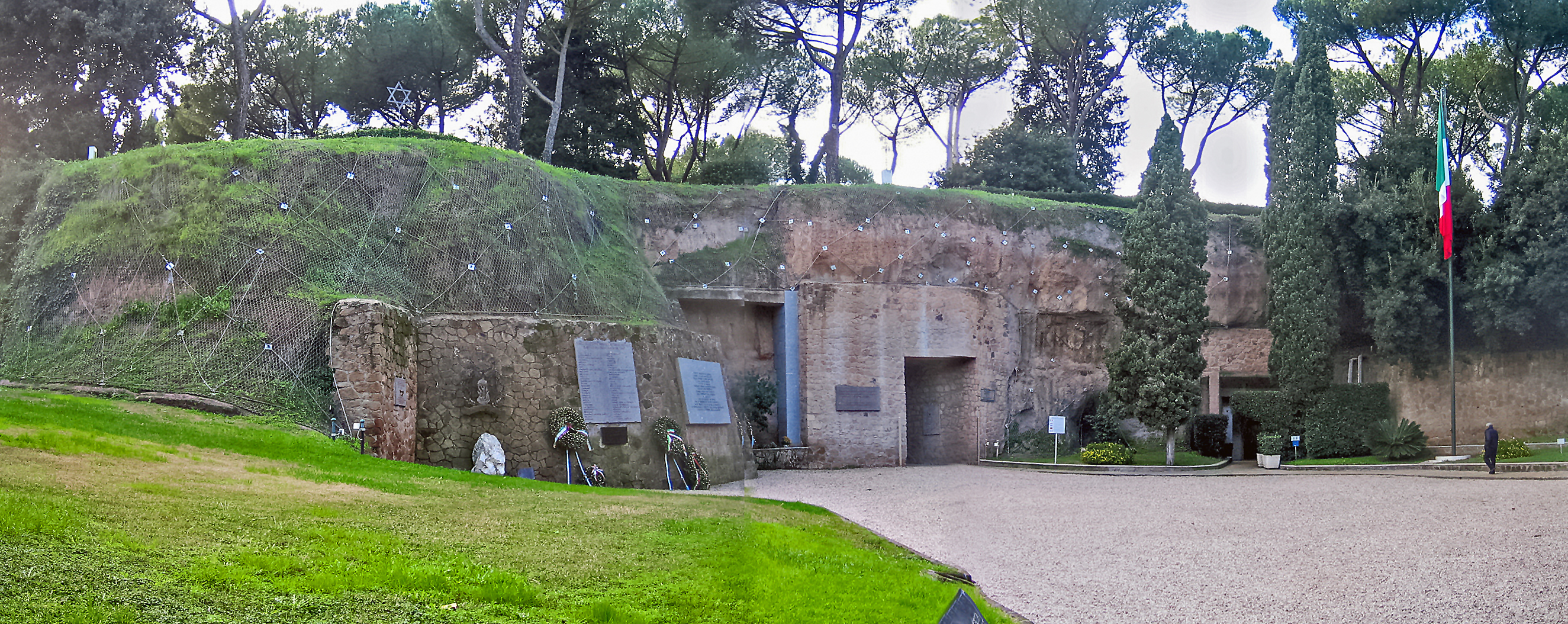
The cave's entrance at the Fosse Ardeatine Monument

To fill the numerical quota, many of the prisoners at Via Tasso and Regina Coeli prisons who happened to be available at the time were sent to their deaths by the Nazis at the Fosse Ardeatine. Priebke put some on the list simply because they were Jewish (sending Jews to the camps, however, he said he had never done so, for practical reasons: "We needed the railway cars for other things").

Some of these prisoners had simply been residents of Via Rasella who were home at the time of the bombing; others had been arrested and tortured for resistance and communist-related activities. Not all of the partisans who were killed were members of the same resistance group. Members of the GAP, the PA, and Bandiera Rossa, in addition to the Clandestine Military Front, were all on the list of those to be executed. Furthermore, the scale and even the occurrence of this retaliation were unprecedented in Italy. Since the Allied invasion of Italy in 1943 and the subsequent overthrow of Mussolini, Communist anti-Fascists and members of the Italian Resistance had been practising guerrilla warfare against Axis troops.

== Post-war ==
=== Escape to Argentina ===
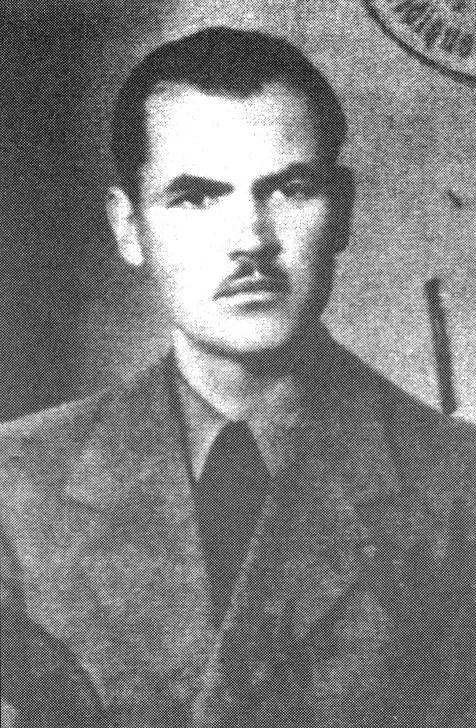
Priebke as "Otto Pape" in 1948

In post–World War II trials, Priebke was set to be tried for his role in the massacre, but he managed to escape from a British prison camp in Rimini, Italy, in 1946. He later claimed that this escape had been assisted by a ratline run by German-Austrian Bishop Alois Hudal. After he had escaped, he lived with his family in Sterzing/Vipiteno. During this time he received on 13 September 1948 a second baptism (and adopted a new identity as Otto Pape) by a local priest. After his time in South Tyrol, he went to Argentina. Though responsible for war crimes, Priebke lived in Argentina in the town of Bariloche as a free man for 46 years. While there, he first worked as a dishwasher and waiter before opening a delicatessen. He also became the leader of the German-Argentine Cultural Association and travelled back and forth to Europe.

In March 1994, an investigative team from ABC News, led by producer Harry Phillips, tracked Priebke to Bariloche after finding mention of his participation in the Ardeatine massacre in a locally written book they found in a used bookstore. The book El pintor de la Suiza Argentina (1991), written by Esteban Buch, named Priebke as part of a clique of Nazis living in Bariloche since the early 1950s.

Over the next several weeks, the ABC News team searched archives in Buenos Aires, Washington, D.C., London, Berlin and Jerusalem, uncovering numerous documents chronicling Priebke's background and involvement with the Gestapo in Italy. Among documents discovered in the Public Records Office in London was a confession, written a few months after the end of World War II, in which Priebke confirmed his role in the Ardeatine Caves Massacre. A document uncovered at the Yad Vashem Museum in Israel indicated that Priebke signed off on the transport of Italian Jews to death camps. As their research continued, the ABC team began surveillance of Priebke, monitoring his daily routine in Bariloche. In April 1994, ABC News reporter Sam Donaldson travelled to Bariloche with Phillips and camera crews to confront Priebke with their research on behalf of the ABC Television news show Primetime Live. Donaldson and his team first confronted another former Nazi living in the same town, Reinhard Kopps, who, when pressed about his own involvement, took Donaldson aside and told him about Priebke, confirming the ABC research.

Donaldson and his team waited for Priebke outside the school where he was working and interviewed him in his car. After initial hesitation, Priebke admitted who he was and spoke openly about his role in the massacre. He justified his actions by saying that he only followed orders from the Gestapo chief of Rome, Obersturmbannführer Herbert Kappler, and that, in his view, the victims were terrorists. He denied to Donaldson that any children were killed, but three children as young as 14 were found among the dead (as were a 75-year-old man and a priest). He admitted that it was he who compiled the lists of those who were going to be executed. When testifying after the war, Kappler explained that Priebke had been ordered to make sure that all the victims were brought to the caves and executed, and to check the list of people who were to be killed.

=== Arrest and extradition of Priebke ===
Donaldson's news report showed how openly Priebke could live in Argentina and how little remorse he felt for his actions. On 10 May 1994, Argentinian authorities arrested Priebke. Because of his old age and poor health, he was at first not imprisoned, but rather held under house arrest at his home in Bariloche, where he had lived since 1948. The extradition of Priebke had several delays. His lawyers used tactics like demanding that all Italian documents be translated into Spanish, a process that could have taken two years. The Argentinian court eventually denied the process, but appeals and other delays caused the extradition case to take more than a year. His lawyers argued that the case could no longer be criminally prosecuted because the crime of murder was subject to a statute of limitations of 15 years under Argentinian law. In March 1995, after nine months of delays, the president of the Jewish organization B'nai B'rith was promised by, among others, the Argentinian president Carlos Menem, that the case would soon be closed and that Priebke was to be transferred to Italy by the end of the month. Despite these promises, the Supreme Court of Argentina decided that the case was to be transferred to the local court in Bariloche, where the case was originally brought up. This opened the possibility for years of delays from future appeals, while Priebke could live at his home.

In May 1995, an Argentinian federal judge accepted the Italian demand for extradition on the grounds that cases of crimes against humanity could not expire; however there were more appeals and rumours that the court might change the ruling. In August 1995, it was judged that Priebke was not to be extradited because the case had expired. To put pressure on the Argentinian government, Germany demanded the extradition the same day. The Italian military prosecutor, Antonio Intelisano, argued that UN agreements to which Argentina was signatory expressly state that cases of war criminals and crimes against humanity do not expire. After 17 months of delays, the Argentinian supreme court decided that Priebke was to be extradited to Italy in 1996. He was put on a direct flight from Bariloche to Rome Ciampino Airport, a military airport close to the Ardeatine caves, where the executions had been carried out many years earlier.

== Trials ==
=== Priebke in court ===
In court, Priebke declared himself not guilty. He did not deny what he had done, but he denied any moral responsibility. He blamed the massacre on those whom he branded as "the Italian terrorists" who were behind the attack in which 33 German SS men were killed. The order came directly from Hitler, and he thought it was a legitimate punishment. During the trial, it became clear that Priebke had personally shot two Italians. This was also in his testimony from 1946, before he managed to escape. Around noon on 24 March 1944, 335 men went to the Ardeatine Caves in Rome. All were tied with their hands behind their backs, and their names were read out loud. In groups of five, they went into the caves. Priebke went inside together with the second or third group and shot a man with an Italian machine pistol. Toward the end, he shot another man with the same machine pistol. The executions ended before dark. After the shootings, explosives were used to shut the caves. Priebke was found not guilty for the reason of acting under orders.

On 1 August 1996, orders were given for the immediate release of Priebke. The Italian minister of justice later said that Priebke might be re-arrested, depending on whether he would be extradited to Germany to be charged with murder. The courts were blocked by demonstrators for over seven hours after Priebke's trial. The judges voted two against one for convicting the 83-year-old Priebke for taking part in the massacres, which he had admitted, but he was acquitted again, purportedly because he had been following orders. There were strong reactions from family members of the victims, who claimed the judges put no value on human lives. Shimon Samuels, the leader of the Simon Wiesenthal Center, said that with this ruling, Italy was permitting crimes against humanity.

=== Appeal ===
The case was appealed by the prosecutors. The day after, Germany asked Italy to keep Priebke imprisoned until their demand to have him extradited was processed, as they wanted him put on trial for the murders of two people that he had personally shot. Outside the courthouse, there were demonstrations, but when it became known that Priebke had been rearrested, these protests calmed down. Many people later went to visit the Ardeatine Caves to honour the victims. Italy's Supreme Court of Cassation decided that the court that had freed Priebke was incompetent, and the appeal went through. Among other things, it was questioned why the example of the Nuremberg trials had not been raised earlier, since they had concluded that an individual has personal responsibility for his actions. The reason that Priebke had been released was that he followed orders. Priebke claimed that if he had not obeyed, he would have been executed, but the appeals would not accept this as they felt it was a baseless excuse. (Note: Without an unquestioning attitude towards obeying orders, the successful conduct of military operations, the success of a military campaign, and even the survival of a nation would be seriously threatened; however, the soldier, and especially the officer, also has a legal obligation to disobey orders that violate the constitution or the law, and has a moral and ethical obligation to disobey orders that are contrary to societal norms. Thus, the soldier's requirement to obey orders is not open-ended, and the oath of loyalty is not an excuse for blind patriotism or blind obedience to orders, the infamous "I was following orders" defence. Even within the German Military tradition, such a defence is not legally permissible, despite its use by the defendants at the Nuremberg war crimes trials (as well as at other war crimes trials). Article 47 of the 1872 German Military Penal Code, still legally in force, if not unenforced, down to 1945, stated: If execution of an order given in the line of duty violates a statute of the penal code, the superior giving the order is alone responsible. However, the subordinate obeying the order is liable to punishment as an accomplice if ... he knew that the order involved an act the commission of which constituted a civil or military crime or offence.) The Supreme Court of Cassation voided the decision, ordering a new trial for Priebke. He was sentenced to 15 years. The sentence was reduced to 10 years because of his age and alleged ill health. In March 1998, the Court of Appeal condemned him to life imprisonment, together with Karl Hass, another former SS member. The decision was upheld in November of the same year by the Supreme Court of Cassation. Because of his age, Priebke was put under house arrest. In March 1997, it was decided that Priebke could not be extradited to Germany. The reason for this was that he was now going through a trial which was for the same charges that Germany wanted him tried. He, therefore, could not be tried for the same crime twice.

=== Priebke's appeals ===
Priebke denied any responsibility and therefore appealed the case. At the appeals, it was decided that Hass and Priebke had committed murder in the first degree and that they should be given life imprisonment. Priebke appealed the case to the European Court of Human Rights in Strasbourg, where he claimed he had no choice but to obey Hitler's orders, a defence not accepted during the Nuremberg trials (see the Nuremberg Defense and Nuremberg Principle IV). Moreover, it has been underlined by many that in the massacre of the Fosse Ardeatine, 335 died, five more than required by the order "10 Italians executed for each German killed". These five extra victims were the responsibility of Priebke alone because he was given the duty of checking the list.

On 20 March 2004, 80 people gathered in a room of the Centro Letterario in Trieste to show their support for Priebke. On 12 June 2007, he received authorization to leave his home to work at his lawyer's office in Rome. This led to angry protests, and the judge's decision was overturned. A number of Italian conservative figures defended Priebke on the grounds that he was only acting to obey orders: Italian journalist Indro Montanelli, who had lost two friends in the massacre of the Fosse Ardeatine, nonetheless wrote a private letter to Priebke that was later published in Il Giornale on 2013 by Fausto Biloslavo, arguing that he was only following orders; similar points of view were expressed by Vittorio Feltri, Giampiero Mughini, Vittorio Sgarbi, Guido Ceronetti, Anna Maria Ortese, and Massimo Fini. In 2003 Senator Antonio Serena (National Alliance) argued that Priebke should have been pardoned by President Carlo Azeglio Ciampi, arguing that Priebke was suffering from "cruel and pointless behaviours" from a "Jewish lobby that spreads hate"; because of this position, Serena was expelled from National Alliance.

== Death ==
Priebke died in Rome on 11 October 2013, at the age of 100. His last request, that his remains be returned to Argentina so he could be buried alongside his wife, was denied by the Argentinian government. The Diocese of Rome issued an "unprecedented ban" on holding his funeral in any Roman Catholic church in Rome. His hometown in Germany also refused to take his body, over fears that his place of burial could become "a pilgrimage site for neo-Nazis".

Following the refusal of the Diocese of Rome to officiate the funeral, Priebke's relatives turned to the Society of Saint Pius X (SSPX), a traditionalist Catholic group which is not in full communion with the Holy See; the SSPX accepted to perform the funeral in the church of their priory in Albano Laziale. During the funeral service, the police prevented clashes from breaking out between fascist sympathizers and anti-fascist protesters. The funeral eventually took place, albeit without the presence of any of his relatives, because his family was unable to enter the church due to the rioting.

Eventually, the coffin containing Priebke's body was seized by the Italian authorities, taken to a military base near Rome, and then buried "in a secret location," as his lawyer Paolo Giachini stated. Giachini said the agreement "satisfie[d] the family and ethical and spiritual requirements." According to L'Espresso, Priebke was buried in the cemetery of a former prison on an island, possibly Pianosa or Capraia. Traditionalist Catholic priest Florian Abrahamowicz, a former member of the SSPX, celebrated a Mass in suffrage of Priebke in a chapel in Paese; the mayor of Resana, Loris Mazzorato (Lega Nord), was among those attending the Mass. Priebke has one child still alive as of February 2026, Ingo Priebke, aged 83, who lives in New York. His other son, Jorge Priebke, remained in Bariloche until his death in 2020.
