= Renato Ricci =

Italian politician (1896–1956)

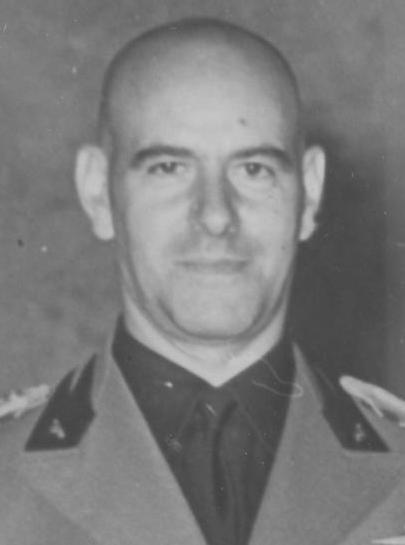
- Ricci in 1942

Commandant-General of the MVSN (the GNR after 8 Dec 1943)
- In office 20 September 1943 – 21 August 1944
- Duce: Benito Mussolini
- Preceded by: Quirino Armellini
- Succeeded by: Benito Mussolini

Minister of Corporations
- In office 31 October 1939 – 5 February 1943
- Prime Minister: Benito Mussolini
- Preceded by: Ferruccio Lantini
- Succeeded by: Carlo Tiengo

Personal details
- Born: 1 June 1896 Carrara, Kingdom of Italy
- Died: 22 January 1956 (aged 59) Rome, Italy
- Party: National Fascist Party
- Other political affiliations: Republican Fascist Party
- Cabinet: Mussolini

Renato Ricci (1 June 1896 – 22 January 1956) was an Italian fascist politician active during the Mussolini government.

== Early life and arrest ==
Ricci was born on 1 June 1896 in Carrara into working-class family. He first came to prominence as a legionary of Gabriele d'Annunzio from 1919 to 1920. He was arrested for his activities and imprisoned in Sarzana leading in 1920 to a failed attempt to liberate him by fascist activists which, despite being a failure proved a propaganda success.

== Mussolini government ==
As ras of the fascio squad in his native town, Ricci initially supported a 40-day strike by quarry workers in 1924. After the spell as a squad leader in Carrara, Ricci's profile rose and he eventually became head of the Opera Nazionale Balilla youth movement. He became a member of government and served as Mussolini's Minister of Corporations. Politically he became known as one of the main Nazi sympathisers in the fascist government. Indeed, along with others of a similar persuasion such as Giovanni Preziosi and Roberto Farinacci, he had fled to Nazi Germany before the Gran Sasso raid and met up with Il Duce there after Otto Skorzeny's capture of the fascist leader.

With a long-standing reputation for violence, Ricci had established links with Heinrich Himmler through the Fascist militia before July 1943. With Nazi support, he and Alessandro Pavolini set about creating a new paramilitary gendarmerie. He served as leader of this group, the National Republican Guard, during the Italian Social Republic. Ricci was also the head of the Republican Police Corps established in December 1944 as part of the Italian Armed Forces. This group included the Blackshirts, the Italian Africa Police members serving in Rome and the Carabinieri. The Corps would be the entity that would work against anti-Fascist groups and would be autonomous (not reporting to Rodolfo Graziani) according to an order issued by Mussolini on 19 November 1944.

== Post-war years and death ==
Following the collapse of the Republic of Salò an Italian resistance movement tribunal discharged Ricci after deciding that his force was simply an internal police. He was sentenced to 30 years of imprisonment but was released in 1950 due to a general amnesty. In 1955, he became one of the founders of the neo-fascist Association of Servicemen of the RSI. He died on 22 January 1956 in Rome.
