= Enzo Galbiati =

Italian soldier and politician

Chief of Staff of the Blackshirts
- In office 25 May 1941 – 26 July 1943
- Duce: Benito Mussolini
- PNF Secretary: Adelchi Serena; Aldo Vidussoni; Carlo Scorza
- Preceded by: Achille Starace
- Succeeded by: Renzo Montagna (Acting)

Personal details
- Born: Enzo Emilio Galbiati; 23 May 1897 Monza, Kingdom of Italy
- Died: 23 May 1982 (aged 85) Solbiate, Italian Republic
- Party: National Fascist Party

Enzo Emilio Galbiati (23 May 1897 – 23 May 1982) was an Italian soldier and fascist politician.

== Biography ==
Born in Monza, Galbiati was a lieutenant in the Royal Italian Army's elite Arditi during the First World War. He was wounded in action in 1917. Whilst still in the army (he was demobilised in 1920) he joined the Monza fascio in 1919 and became the leader of the squadristi. Involved in the March on Rome, Galbiati gained a reputation for his brutality as a squad leader and in 1924 he charged with, although later acquitted of, murder. As a consul of the Blackshirts, Galbiati was involved in the 'revolt of the consuls' when on 31 December 1924 thirty leading fascists entered the offices of Benito Mussolini in an attempt to force him to overcome the political impasse that followed the Matteotti Crisis.

From 1925 to the following year Galbiati was out of the fascist movement after Mussolini expelled him for his involvement in the 'revolt'. However he was soon readmitted and once again became a leading figure in the Blackshirts, suffering further war wounds in the Second Italo-Abyssinian War. Returning to Italy he was appointed inspector of university militias and had risen to the rank of Luogotenente Generale in the Blackshirts by the time Italy entered the Second World War. He saw service in the Italian invasion of Albania before in May 1941 succeeding Achille Starace as Blackshirt Chief of Staff. By 1943 he was the national commander of the Milizia Volontaria per la Sicurezza Nazionale (MVSN), as the Blackshirts were formally known.

=== The role in the fall of Mussolini ===
Despite his earlier involvement in the consuls' revolt Galbiati became a staunch Mussolini loyalist in later years and opposed the motion against him on 25 July 1943. On the morning of that day, he proposed to Mussolini the arrest of the nineteen gerarchi who had voted for the "OdG Grandi" (order of the day from Dino Grandi), but he refused. When news of Mussolini's arrest was released at 7 o'clock in the evening the headquarters of the MVSN in Viale Romania were surrounded by army units. Galbiati, who was in his office, ordered the MVSN not to provoke incidents. Although the majority of his officers wanted to react, after consulting with four generals he called the under-secretary of the interior Umberto Albini and told him that the MVSN would have "remained faithful to its principles, that is to serve the fatherland through its pair, Duce and King." After that, it was clear that the Blackshirts would have not reacted to the putsch. Shortly before midnight, he was ordered to hand over control to the army general Quirino Armellini. Galbiati capitulated to Grandi's men and it has been argued that it was this that cost him a high office in the Italian Social Republic. He served 11 months in prison after the war, before largely disappearing from the public eye.

== Bibliography ==
- Carlo Rastrelli. Enzo Galbiati. Storia Militare N° 161 (Febbraio 2007) pag. 29-41
- Bianchi, Gianfranco (1989). 25 Luglio: crollo di un regime (in Italian). Milano: Mursia.

Government offices
| Preceded by Achille Starace | Chief of Staff of the Blackshirts; 25 May 1941 – 26 July 1943 | Succeeded by Renzo Montagna; Acting |
