= List of commanders of the Blackshirts =

This article lists the commanders of the Blackshirts (Italian: Camicie Nere, CCNN; officially Milizia Volontaria per la Sicurezza Nazionale, MVSN — "Voluntary Militia for National Security"), a paramilitary wing of the Italian National Fascist Party (PNF), between the years of 1923 (Note: After approval by the Mussolini government on 28 December 1922, the draft law on founding the MVSN was approved by a resolution of the Grand Council of Fascism on 12 January 1923. The draft became law under Royal Decree No. 31 of 14 January 1923, issued by the King Victor Emmanuel III. The activities of the MVSN began on 1 February 1923.) and 1943.

== Commandants−General ==
Commandant-General of the Blackshirts
- Comandante generale della MVSN (Italian)
- Rank insignia

- Command flag

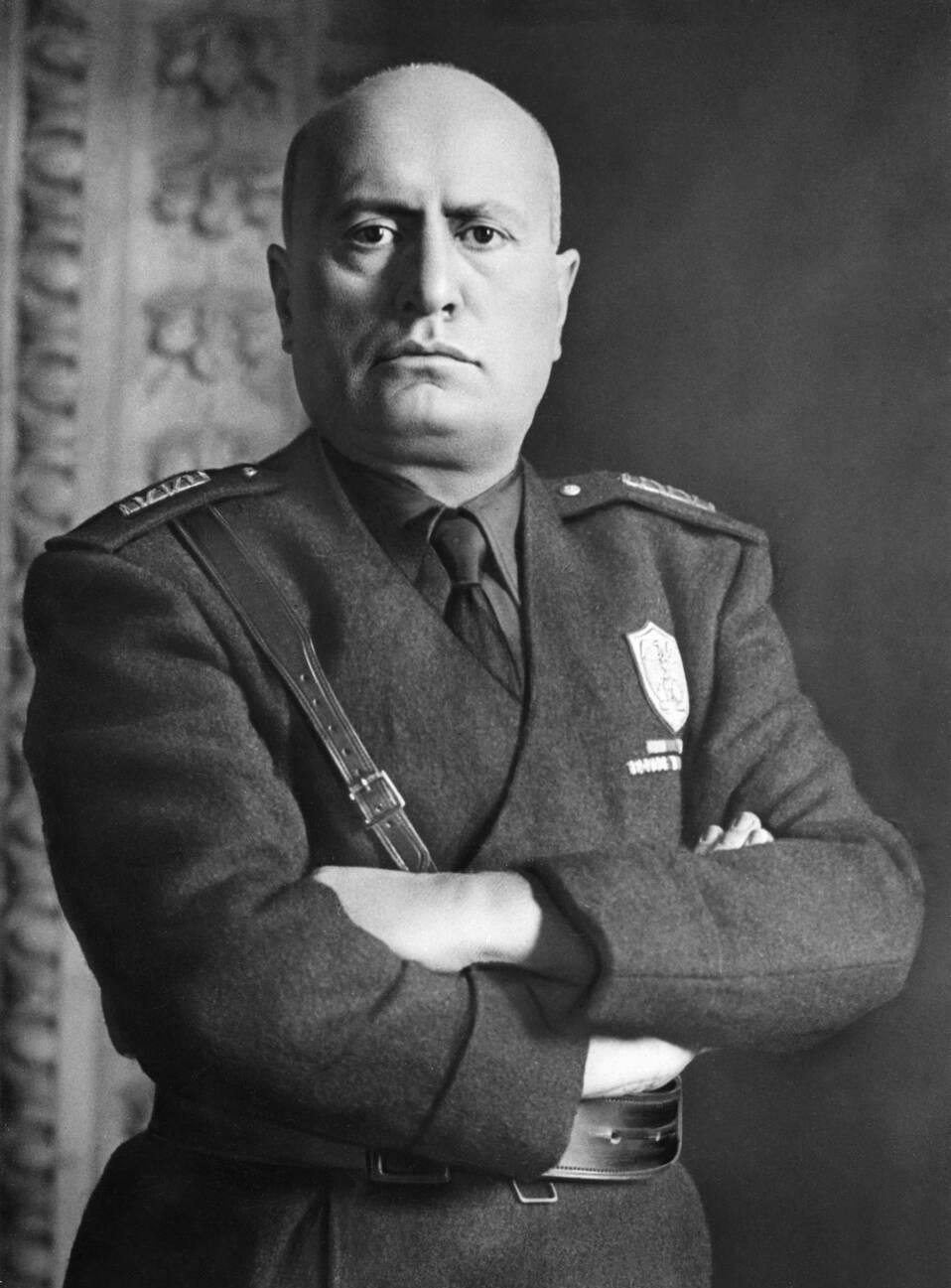
- Longest serving Benito Mussolini; 12 October 1926–25 July 1943
- Blackshirts
- Type: Commanding officer of a paramilitary organization
- Member of: Stato Maggiore della MVSN; Grand Council of Fascism
- Appointer: the Duce
- Formation: 1 February 1923
- First holder: Held simultaneously by: Emilio De Bono; Italo Balbo; Cesare Maria De Vecchi
- Final holder: Renato Ricci
- Abolished: 8 December 1943

The Commandant-General of the Blackshirts (Italian: Comandante generale della MVSN) was the supreme commander of the Blackshirts.

=== List of officeholders ===
No.	Portrait	Name (Birth–Death)	Term of office			Party	Ref.
No.	Portrait	Name (Birth–Death)	Took office	Left office	Time in office	Party	Ref.
1		Marshal of Italy; Emilio De Bono (1866–1944)	1 February 1923	31 October 1924	1 year, 273 days	National Fascist Party	
1		Marshal of the Air; Italo Balbo (1896–1940)	1 February 1923	31 October 1924	1 year, 273 days	National Fascist Party	
1		General; Cesare Maria De Vecchi (1884–1959)	1 February 1923	10 July 1925	2 years, 159 days	National Fascist Party	
2		General; Asclepia Gandolfo (1864–1925)	1 December 1924	31 August 1925	273 days	National Fascist Party	
3		General; Maurizio Ferrante Gonzaga (1861–1938)	12 September 1925	9 October 1926	1 year, 27 days	National Fascist Party	
4		First Marshal of the Empire; Benito Mussolini (1883–1945)	12 October 1926	25 July 1943	16 years, 286 days	National Fascist Party	
5		General; Quirino Armellini (1889–1975)	26 July 1943	8 September 1943	44 days	Independent	
6		Renato Ricci (1896–1956)	20 September 1943	8 December 1943 (Note: Continued as commander of the National Republican Guard.)	79 days	Republican Fascist Party	

== Chiefs of Staff ==
Chief of Staff of the Blackshirts
- Capo di stato maggiore della MVSN (Italian)
- Rank insignia

- Command flag

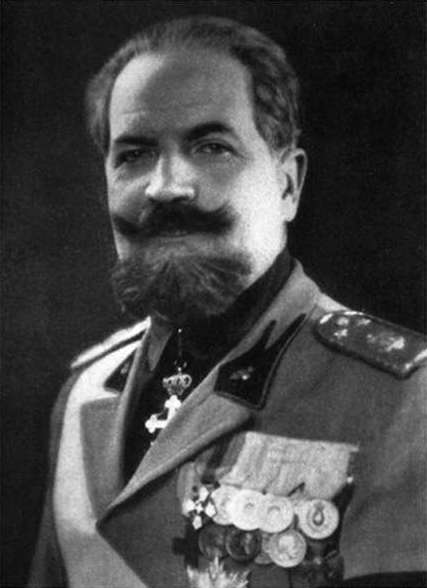
- Longest serving Attilio Teruzzi; 2 January 1929–3 October 1935
- Blackshirts
- Type: Chief of staff of a paramilitary organization
- Member of: Stato Maggiore della MVSN; Grand Council of Fascism
- Appointer: the Duce
- Formation: 1 February 1923
- First holder: Francesco Sacco
- Final holder: Renzo Montagna (acting)
- Abolished: 30 September 1943

The Chief of Staff of the Blackshirts (Italian: Capo di stato maggiore della MVSN) oversaw the day-to-day operations of the Blackshirts.

=== List of officeholders ===
No.	Portrait	Name (Birth–Death)	Term of office			Party	Ref.
No.	Portrait	Name (Birth–Death)	Took office	Left office	Time in office	Party	Ref.
1		Lieutenant general Francesco Sacco (1877–1958)	1 February 1923	1 December 1924	1 year, 304 days	National Fascist Party	
2		Lieutenant general Enrico Bazan (1864–1947)	1 December 1924	23 December 1928	4 years, 22 days	National Fascist Party	–
3		Lieutenant general Attilio Teruzzi (1882–1950)	2 January 1929	3 October 1935	6 years, 274 days	National Fascist Party	
4		Lieutenant general Luigi Russo (1882–1964)	3 October 1935	3 November 1939	4 years, 31 days	National Fascist Party	–
5		Achille Starace (1889–1945)	3 November 1939	16 May 1941	1 year, 194 days	National Fascist Party	
6		Lieutenant general Enzo Galbiati (1897–1982)	25 May 1941	26 July 1943	2 years, 62 days	National Fascist Party	
–		Lieutenant general Renzo Montagna (1894–1978); Acting	17 September 1943	30 September 1943	13 days	Independent	

== See also ==
- List of secretaries of Italian fascist parties
