= List of secretaries of Italian fascist parties =

Secretary of the National Fascist Party
- Segretario del Partito Nazionale Fascista (Italian)
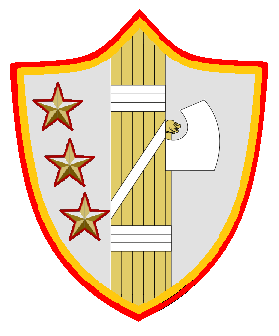
- Rank insignia

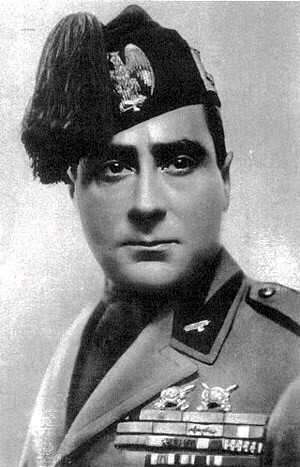
- Longest serving Achille Starace; 12 December 1931–31 October 1939
- National Fascist Party
- Type: Party secretary
- Member of: Grand Council of Fascism
- Appointer: the Duce
- Formation: 23 March 1919
- First holder: Duumvirate
- Final holder: Alessandro Pavolini
- Abolished: 28 April 1945

This article lists the secretaries of Italian fascist parties founded and led by Benito Mussolini between 1919 and 1945, namely Italian Fasces of Combat (FIC), National Fascist Party (PNF) and Republican Fascist Party (PFR).

The secretaries were effective, day-to-day leaders of parties, while Mussolini was the overall (supreme) leader, as well as Duce of the Fascist-ruled Kingdom of Italy between 1922 and 1943, and the Nazi-dominated Italian Social Republic (RSI) between 1943 and 1945.

== List of officeholders ==
=== Italian Fasces of Combat ===
No.	Portrait	Name (Birth–Death)	Term of office			Ref.
No.	Portrait	Name (Birth–Death)	Took office	Left office	Time in office	Ref.
1		Duumvirate (Note: Consisted of Michele Bianchi and Attilio Longoni.)	23 March 1919	1 August 1919	131 days	
2		Umberto Pasella (1870–1957)	1 August 1919	10 November 1921	2 years, 101 days	

=== National Fascist Party ===
No.	Portrait	Name (Birth–Death)	Term of office			Ref.
No.	Portrait	Name (Birth–Death)	Took office	Left office	Time in office	Ref.
1		Michele Bianchi (1883–1930)	10 November 1921	13 October 1923	1 year, 337 days	
2		Francesco Giunta (1887–1971)	13 October 1923	23 April 1924	193 days	
3		Quadrumvirate (Note: Consisted of Roberto Forges Davanzati, Cesare Rossi, Giovanni Marinelli and Alessandro Melchiori.)	23 April 1924	15 February 1925	298 days	
4		Roberto Farinacci (1892–1945)	15 February 1925	30 March 1926	1 year, 43 days	
5		Augusto Turati (1888–1955)	30 March 1926	7 October 1930	4 years, 191 days	
6		Giovanni Giuriati (1876–1970)	7 October 1930	12 December 1931	1 year, 66 days	
7		Achille Starace (1889–1945)	12 December 1931	31 October 1939	7 years, 323 days	
8		Ettore Muti (1902–1943)	31 October 1939	30 October 1940	365 days	
9		Adelchi Serena (1895–1970)	30 October 1940	26 December 1941	1 year, 57 days	
10		Aldo Vidussoni (1914–1982)	26 December 1941	19 April 1943	1 year, 114 days	
11		Carlo Scorza (1897–1988)	19 April 1943	27 July 1943	99 days	

=== Republican Fascist Party ===
No.	Portrait	Name (Birth–Death)	Term of office			Ref.
No.	Portrait	Name (Birth–Death)	Took office	Left office	Time in office	Ref.
1		Alessandro Pavolini (1903–1945)	15 November 1943	28 April 1945	1 year, 164 days	

== See also ==
- List of commanders of the Blackshirts
