= Republican Police Corps =

Republican Police Corps Corpo di Polizia Repubblicana
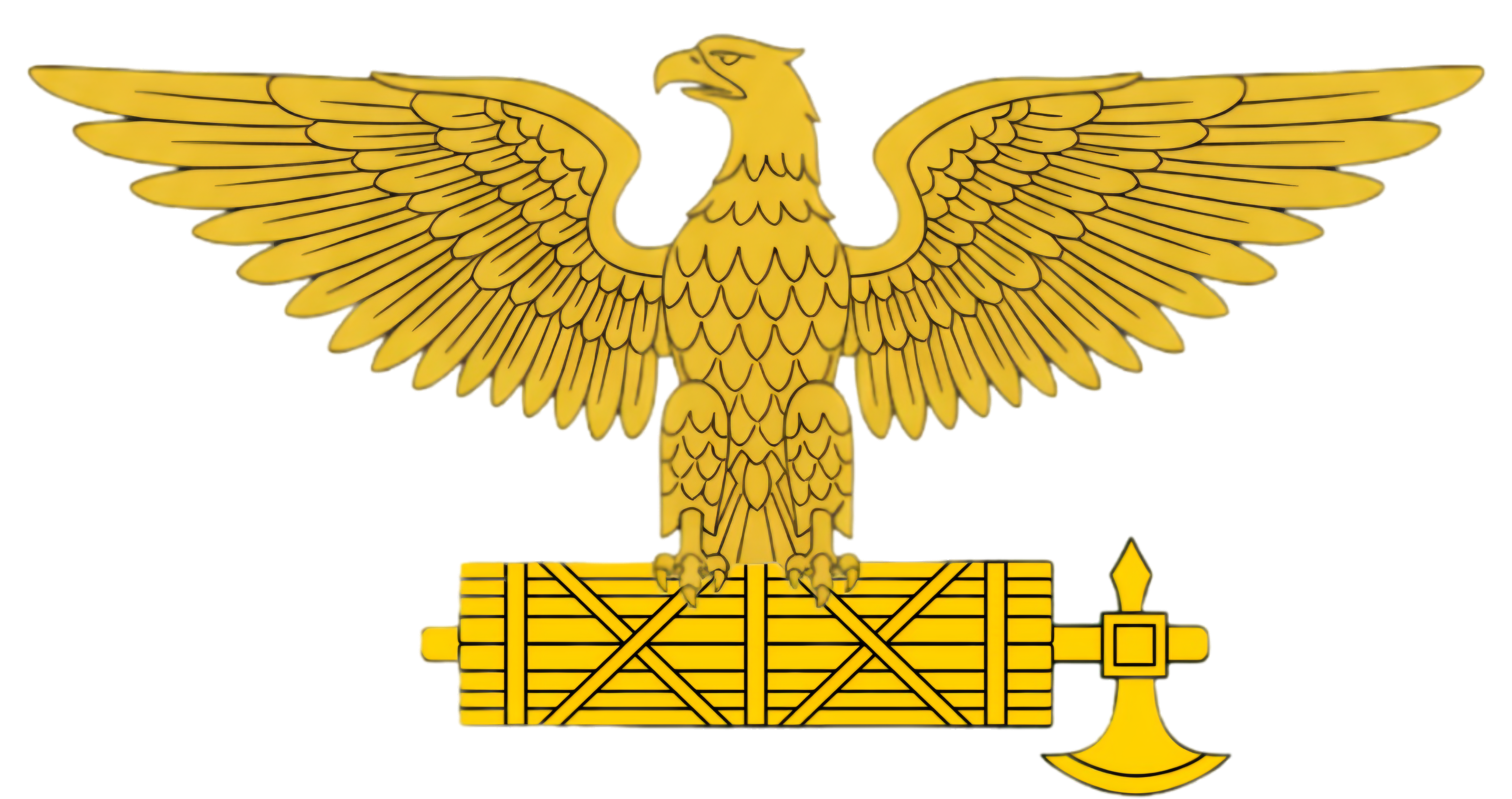
- Headgear insignia

Agency overview
- Formed: 1943
- Preceding agency: Directorate General of Public Security
- Dissolved: 1945
- Superseding agency: Directorate General of Public Security
- Employees: 20,000

Jurisdictional structure
- National agency
- General nature: Civilian police

The Republican Police Corps (Italian: Corpo di Polizia Repubblicana) was a police force of the Italian Social Republic during the Italian Civil War.

== History ==
The Republican Police Corps was established in December 1944 as part of the Italian Armed Forces, within the territory controlled by the Italian Social Republic. The force was established in order to carry out law enforcement and public security duties alongside the National Republican Guard. The new Corps, under Lieutenant-General Renato Ricci, included the Fascist Blackshirts, the Italian Africa Police members serving in Rome and the Carabinieri. The Corps would be the entity that would work against anti-Fascist groups and would be autonomous (not reporting to Rodolfo Graziani) according to an order issued by Mussolini on 19 November 1944.

The Police Corps inherited civilian officials both from the Directorate General of Public Security and from the former Public Security Agents Corps. The organization of the police force in the Fascist-led Republic anticipated that of the Italian State Police established in 1981. The Republican Police Corps was a single government agency, which set it apart from the previous organization (which was upheld in post-war Italy). Previously, the police consisted of civilian police officials and military-organized agents.

At the end of the war, the Republican Police Corps was reabsorbed into the Directorate General of Public Security. The police activities were not carried out uniformly: there were German (particularly Waffen-SS) interferences and power abuses made by political authorities.

== Organization ==
The Republican Police Corps numbered about 20 000, deployed mostly in provincial capital cities; they were framed into 10 Regional Inspectorates and 66 Questure (provincial-level commands), 2 Speciality schools in Padua, escort teams detached at the Ministries, including the "Public Security Presidential Squad" (Italian: Squadra Presidenziale di Pubblica Sicurezza) tasked with Benito Mussolini's personal security. There were also operational mobile units, in order to carry out counter-guerrilla warfare and territorial control duties.

The counter-guerrilla units, belonging to police forces, were:

- 6 military-organized battalions;
- Mobile Autonomous Legion "Ettore Muti", led by Colonel Franco Colombo;
- Special Inspectorate Anti-Partisan Police;
- Police Arditi Legion "Caruso".

Each Questura had a company-sized public order duty; also the Regional Inspectorates had analogous units. Alongside the regular police forces, did exist some "special police units", including ill-famed "Banda Koch" (formally known as "Reparto Speciale di Polizia Repubblicana" or "Republican Police Special Unit") active in Rome, "Banda Carità" (also known as "Reparto Servizi Speciali" or "Special Services Unit") active in Florence and Padua, and other so-called "Repression bands". Most of these band members were heavily sentenced or extra-judicially killed in the immediate aftermath of World War II.

== Chiefs of the Republican Police Corps ==
- Tullio Tamburini, from 1 October 1943 to April 1944;
- Eugenio Cerruti, from April 1944 to October 1944;
- Renzo Montagna, from 6 October 1944 to 25 April 1945.

== See also ==
- Italian Social Republic
- Polizia di Stato
- National Republican Guard
- Banda Koch
