= Renzo Montagna =

Italian general during World War II (1894–1978)

- Born: 13 March 1894; Santa Giuletta, Kingdom of Italy
- Died: 6 July 1978 (aged 84); Voghera, Italy
- Military career
- Allegiance: Kingdom of Italy; Italian Social Republic
- Branch: Royal Italian Army; MVSN; National Republican Army; Republican Police Corps
- Rank: Major General
- Commands: 423rd Bombard Battery; 13th Bombard Battery; 38th Blackshirt Legion; 3rd Blackshirt Legion "Subalpina"; 9th CCNN Legions Group; 4th Blackshirt Battalions Group; Blackshirt Tactical Group "Montagna"; Blackshirt Groupment "XXI Aprile"; 208th Regional Military Command; 206th Regional Military Command; Republican Police Corps; 205th Regional Military Command
- Conflicts: World War I; Battle of Asiago; Battles of the Isonzo; Battle of Caporetto; Battle of Vittorio Veneto; Second Italo-Ethiopian War; World War II; Italian occupation of Slovenia; Italian Civil War
- Awards: Bronze Medal of Military Valor (three times); Order of the Crown of Italy; Colonial Order of the Star of Italy; Order of Saints Maurice and Lazarus

Renzo Montagna (13 March 1894 – 6 July 1978) was an Italian Blackshirt, policeman and general during World War II. After the Armistice of Cassibile he joined the Italian Social Republic, becoming the last commander of the MVSN before its dissolution and later the last chief of the police of the Italian Social Republic.

== Biography ==
After attending classical high school in Voghera, he attended a cadet officer course in 1914-1915, graduating as artillery second lieutenant and participating in the First World War in the bombardiers, fighting on the Asiago plateau, on the Karst Plateau and in Gorizia during 1916 and 1917; he was promoted to lieutenant and later to captain, commanding the 423rd Bombard Battery during the assault on Monte Tonale in May 1918 and the 13th Bombard Battery that entered Trento in early November, after the battle of Vittorio Veneto. During the war he was awarded two bronze medals for military valor. After being discharged in October 1920, he joined the Italian Fasces of Combat, founding a local section in his native Santa Giuletta and becoming a squadrista. After the establishment of the Fascist regime, on 1 February 1923 he joined the newly established Voluntary Militia for National Security, where he made a rapid career; in 1924 he commanded the 38th Blackshirt Legion of Asti, in 1927 the 3rd Blackshirt Legion "Subalpina" of Cuneo and in 1929 the 9th CCNN Legions Group. In 1935-1936, with the rank of console generale (equivalent to brigadier general), he participated in the conquest of Ethiopia in command of the 4th Blackshirt Battalions Group, capturing the Amba Alagi on 28 February 1936.

During World War II, after promotion to luogotenente generale (major general), in July 1942 he became commander of the garrison of Ljubljana and of the Blackshirt Tactical Group "Montagna" (made up of the 2nd Blackshirt Mountain Legion "Alpina" and of the 71st and 81st Blackshirt Battalions), later renamed Blackshirt Groupment "XXI Aprile", part of General Mario Robotti's XI Army Corps; he was awarded a third bronze medal for his role in anti-partisan operations between July and November 1942. He was replaced in this post by Niccolò Nicchiarelli on 19 April 1943 and returned to Italy, where after the fall of the Fascist regime on 25 July he was arrested in his estate in Santa Giuletta by the new government in August. He was then imprisoned in Forte Boccea in Rome, along with Enzo Galbiati, Ubaldo Soddu, Ugo Cavallero, Augusto Agostini (former commander of the Forestry Militia) and Guido Buffarini Guidi, but was freed by the Germans after the Armistice of Cassibile on the following 12 September; following an agreement with the German commands, he immediately set out to reconstitute the Voluntary Militia for National Security and on 17 September 1943 he took seat in the former General Command of the MVSN in Rome, which had been abandoned after 25 July. As the highest ranking Blackshirt officer in Rome, he took over from Italo Romegialli as provisional Commander-General of the MVSN; he retrieved some M13/40 tanks and L6/40 tanks and arranged them to protect the most sensitive targets such as the "Mussolini" Barracks and the headquarters of the newly established Republican Fascist Party in Palazzo Wedekind, of which he also managed the provincial section until the arrival of Alessandro Pavolini on September 18.

After Pavolini assumed command over the Roman Fascists in the following days, Montagna dedicated himself completely to MVSN. According to him, the National Republican Army (military of the Italian Social Republic) should have been born as an extension of the MVSN, the only armed force that had not dissolved after the armistice and had maintained its alliance with the Germans; he lamented how the MVSN had been merged completely into the National Republican Guard together with the Carabinieri and the PAI, losing its military character to become what was "essentially a police force". On 11 November 1943 he was appointed commander of the 208th (Marche) Regional Military Command, with headquarters in Macerata, until the evacuation of RSI forces in the region in July 1944. In January 1944 he was appointed judge in the Verona Trial against the members of the Grand Council of Fascism who had voted the order of the day which had resulted in the fall of the Mussolini government on 25 July 1943. Montagna argued that Marshal of Italy Emilio De Bono should not be sentenced to death, but his efforts were frustrated by the opposition of the intransigent Enrico Vezzalini.

At dawn on 9 July 1944, while he was spending the night in his villa in Monteceresino (near Santa Giuletta), Montagna was subjected to an attempted kidnapping by members of the Italian Resistance, which was however repelled by the guards and by Montagna himself; one partisan was killed. Montagna was later appointed commander of the 206th (Piedmont) Regional Military Command, with headquarters in Alessandria, until 4 October 1944, when he became commander of the Republican Police Corps, a post he held until the end of the war. In early 1945 he was also briefly appointed commander of the 205th (Lombardy) Regional Military Command, with headquarters in Milan.

In mid-April 1945 Montagna, with Mussolini's permission, made contact with representatives of the Milanese National Liberation Committee, without any concrete result. He became a fugitive after the end of the war, until he was amnestied by the Court of Assize of Como on 29 May 1947. He then retired to private life, dying in Voghera on 6 July 1978.
