= Roberto Farinacci =

Italian fascist politician (1892–1945)

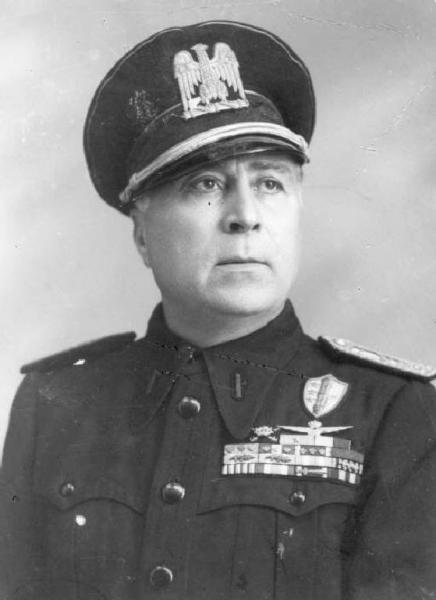

Secretary of the National Fascist Party
- In office 15 February 1925 – 30 March 1926
- Preceded by: Quadrumvirate
- Succeeded by: Augusto Turati

Member of the Chamber of Fasces and Corporations
- In office 23 March 1939 – 5 August 1943
- Appointed by: Benito Mussolini

Member of the Chamber of Deputies
- In office 11 June 1921 – 2 March 1939
- Constituency: Italy at-large

Personal details
- Born: 16 October 1892 Isernia, Kingdom of Italy
- Died: 28 April 1945 (aged 52) Vimercate, Italian Social Republic
- Cause of death: Execution by firing squad
- Party: PSRI (1914–1919); FIC (1919–1921); PNF (1921–1943); PFR (1943–1945)
- Height: 1.74 m (5 ft 9 in)
- Spouse: Anita Bertolazzi (m. 1910)
- Profession: Journalist, soldier

Military service
- Allegiance: Kingdom of Italy
- Branch/service: Royal Italian Army; Italian Air Force
- Years of service: 1916–1917; 1936
- Rank: Flight lieutenant; Corporal
- Unit: 3rd Telegraphist Regiment; Blackshirts
- Battles/wars: First World War; Second Italo-Ethiopian War

Roberto Farinacci (Italian pronunciation: [roˈbɛrto fariˈnattʃi]; 16 October 1892 – 28 April 1945) was a leading Italian fascist politician and important member of the National Fascist Party before and during World War II, as well as one of its ardent proponents of antisemitism. English historian Christopher Hibbert describes him as "slavishly pro-German".

== Early life ==
Born in Isernia, Molise, Farinacci was raised in poverty. He moved with his family to Tortona in 1900 and to Cremona in 1908. The next year, he dropped out of school and began working as a telegraph operator for the state railway in Cremona. Farinacci described himself as Catholic. He soon became involved in politics under the patronage of the local deputy Leonida Bissolati, the leader of the Socialist Party's reformist faction. After the start of World War I, he became the most prominent voice in the city and province of Cremona in favor of Italy's participation in the war. He joined the Italian army in 1915 and served on the frontlines until 1917, when he was sent on indefinite leave.

By the end of the war he was clearly an important figure in Cremona politics and was seeking means to further increase his power. In January 1919, Farinacci broke with Bissolati and became an ardent supporter of Benito Mussolini and his Fascist movement. Two months later, he was one of the seventy men who founded the Fasci Italiani di Combattimento with Mussolini at Piazza San Sepolcro in Milan. He subsequently established himself as the Ras (local leader, a title borrowed from the Ethiopian aristocracy) of the Fascists in Cremona, publishing the newspaper Cremona Nuova (later on ll Regime Fascista) and organizing Blackshirts combat squads in 1919. The Cremona squads were amongst the most brutal in Italy and Farinacci effectively used them to terrorize the population into submission to Fascist rule.

In 1921, Farinacci left his railroad job and was elected in May of that year to the Chamber of Deputies along with 34 other Fascist candidates (including Mussolini).

== Prominence ==
Quickly rising as one of the most powerful members of the National Fascist Party, gathering around him a large number of supporters, Farinacci came to represent the most radical syndicalist faction of the party, one that thought Mussolini to be a too liberal leader (likewise, Mussolini believed Farinacci was too violent and irresponsible). Among Fascists, Farinacci was known to be particularly anti-clerical, xenophobic and antisemitic. Nevertheless, Farinacci's career continued to rise and played a considerable role in establishing Fascist dominance over Italy during and after the 1922 March on Rome.

In 1925, Farinacci became the second most powerful man in the country when Mussolini appointed him secretary of the party. He was used by Mussolini to centralize the party and then to purge it of thousands of its radical members. Then, Farinacci was removed. He disappeared from the limelight, practicing law for much of the late 1920s and early 1930s. In a 1929 Time article, Farinacci was nicknamed the "castor oil man" of Fascism, based on his forcing of opponents of Fascism to swallow castor oil which he called the "golden nectar of nausea". The effects of swallowing castor oil would cause the victims to suffer severe diarrhea followed by dehydration. The Time article also claims that as secretary of the party he allowed the murderers of Italian Socialist Party deputy Giacomo Matteotti to be let free in 1926.

In 1935, Farinacci fought in the Second Italo-Abyssinian War as a member of the Voluntary Militia for National Security (MVSN), the new official name of the Blackshirts, eventually attaining the rank of lieutenant general. He lost his right hand fishing with a hand grenade near Dessie, an incident for which Ettore Muti ironically nicknamed him "Martin pescatore" (kingfisher). In the same year, Farinacci joined the Grand Council of Fascism and returned to national prominence. In 1937, Farinacci participated in the Spanish Civil War and in 1938 became a governmental minister and enforced the antisemitic racial segregation measures declared by Mussolini.

== In World War II ==
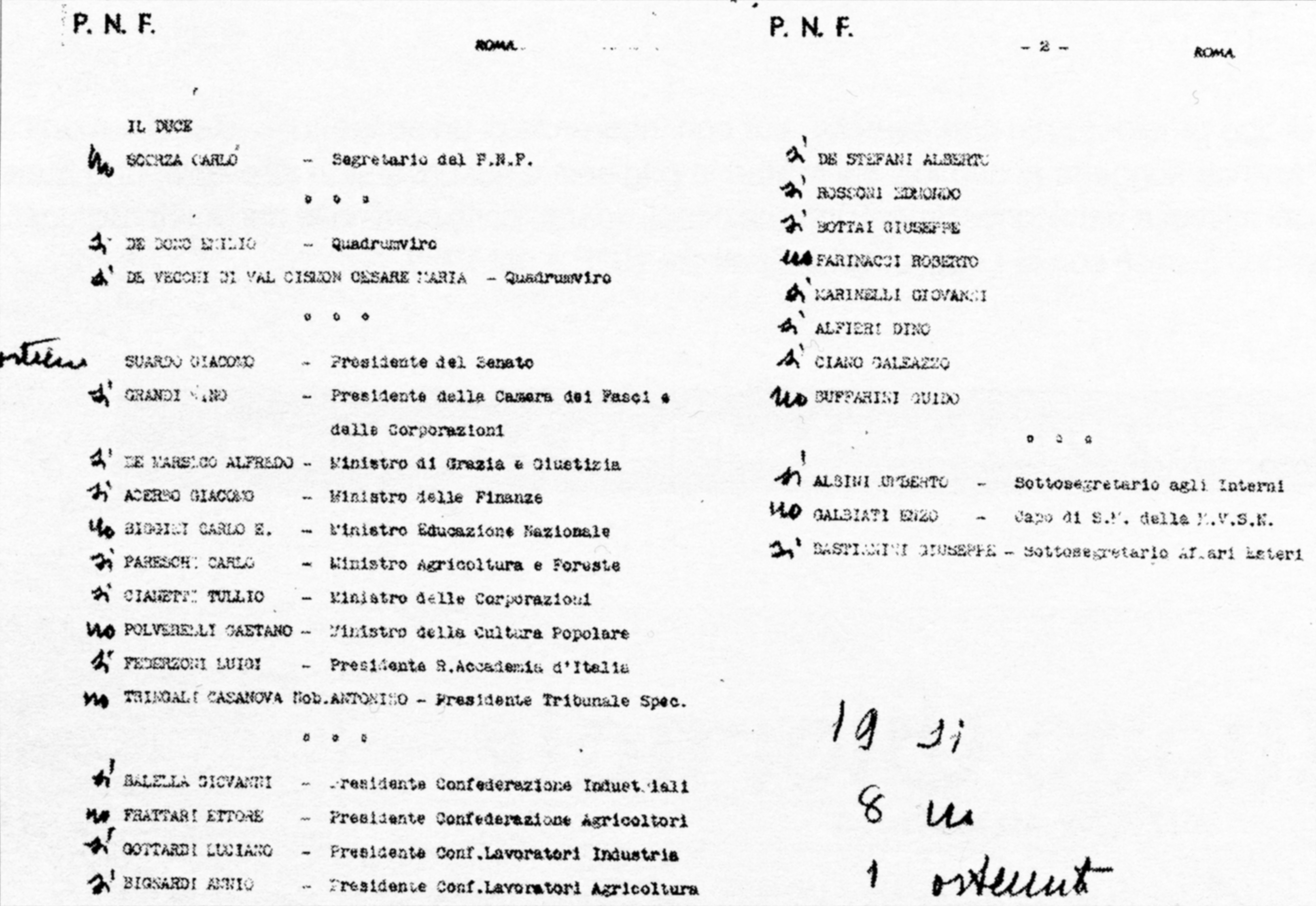
The outcome of a vote of Grand Council of Fascism in which Farinacci voted against

When World War II began, Farinacci sided with Nazi Germany. He frequently communicated with the Nazis and became one of Mussolini's advisors on Italy's dealings with Germany. For his part, Farinacci urged Mussolini to enter Italy into the war as a member of the Axis. In 1941, Farinacci became Inspector of the Militia in Italian-occupied Albania.

In July 1943, Farinacci took part in the Grand Council of Fascism meeting which led to Mussolini's downfall. While the majority of the council voted to force Mussolini out of the government, Farinacci did not side against him. After Mussolini's arrest, Farinacci fled to Germany in order to escape arrest.

The Nazi hierarchy considered putting Farinacci in charge of a German-backed Italian government in Northern Italy (the Italian Social Republic), but he was passed over in favor of Mussolini when the latter was rescued by Otto Skorzeny in September through the raid known as Unternehmen Eiche. Afterwards, Farinacci went back to Cremona without taking active part in political life. However, he did continue to write politically oriented articles. He also funded the journal Crociata Italica, the main organ of a small group of clerical fascist priests led by Don Tullio Calcagno.

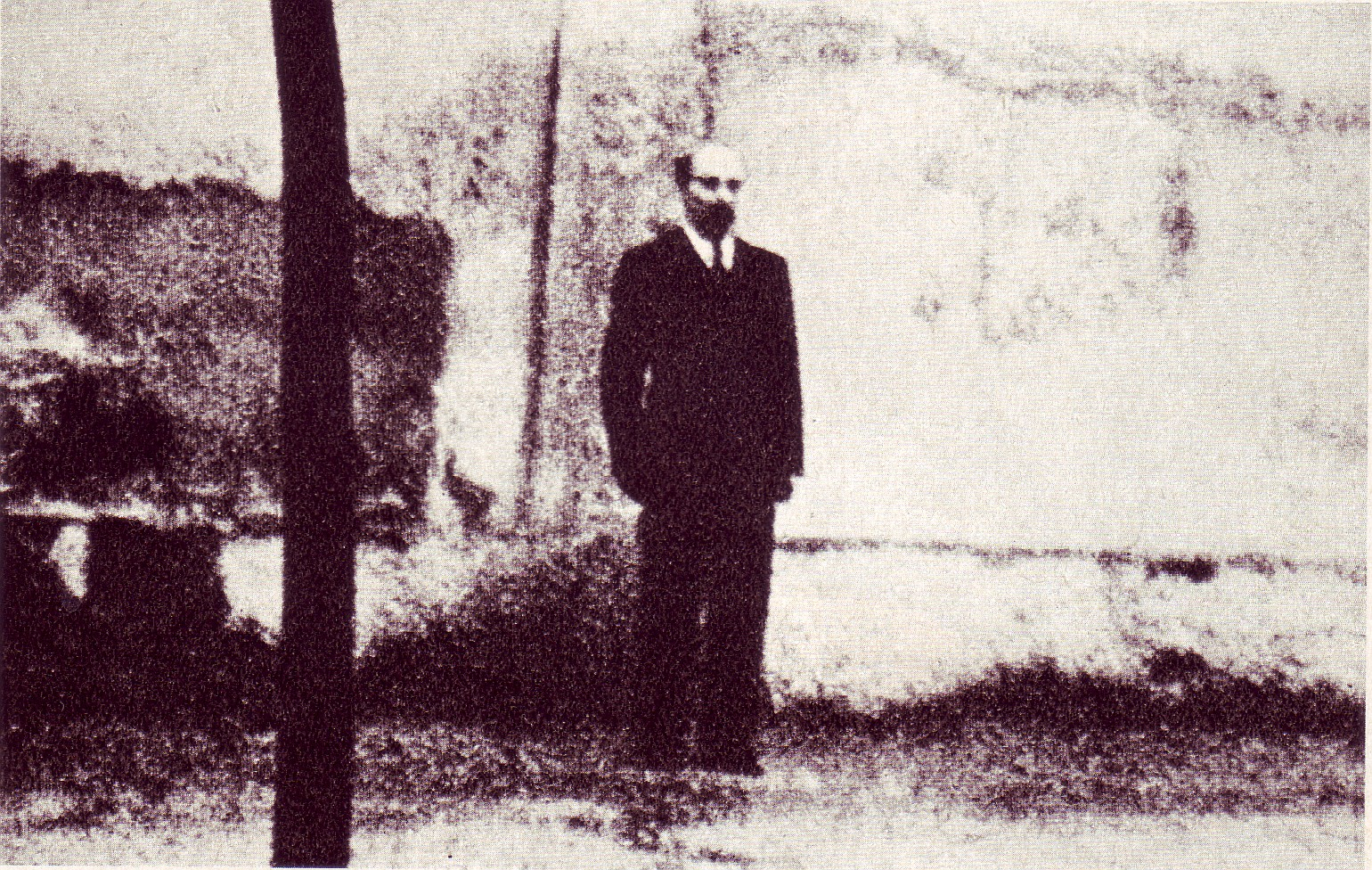
Farinacci's execution

In the morning of 26 April 1945, in the closing days of World War II, Farinacci fled Cremona and headed towards Valtellina, along with a small group of Fascist diehards. Near Bergamo he parted from the main column and headed towards Vimercate along with marquise Maria Carolina Vidoni Soranzo, secretary of the female Fasces, whose sister owned a villa there. On 27 April their car ran into a partisan patrol near Brivio and refused to stop, resulting in a shootout in which the driver was killed and Marquise Vidoni Soranzo was mortally wounded. The uninjured Farinacci was captured along with twelve suitcases, filled with money and jewels; he was brought to the town hall of Vimercate and tried by a partisan court. He demanded to be brought to Cremona, claiming that "there they will tell you that I did good and that I must be released", and contesting all accusations against him; there was some indecision about the sentence, as the representatives of the Christian Democracy and of the Italian Liberal Party wanted to hand him over to the Allies, whereas those of the Italian Communist Party and of the Italian Socialist Party wanted to execute him. In the end he was sentenced to death and executed by firing squad in the main square of Vimercate on 28 April 1945. The partisans wanted to shoot him in the back, but at last second he turned and was thus shot in the chest, reportedly shouting "Long live Italy".

In the Florestano Vancini's film The Assassination of Matteotti (1973), Farinacci is played by Max Dorian. Together with Giovanni Preziosi, Farinacci was one of the most prominent Fascist voices of racial antisemitism during the Mussolini regime.
