= Luigi Russo =

Italian Fascist politician (1882–1964)

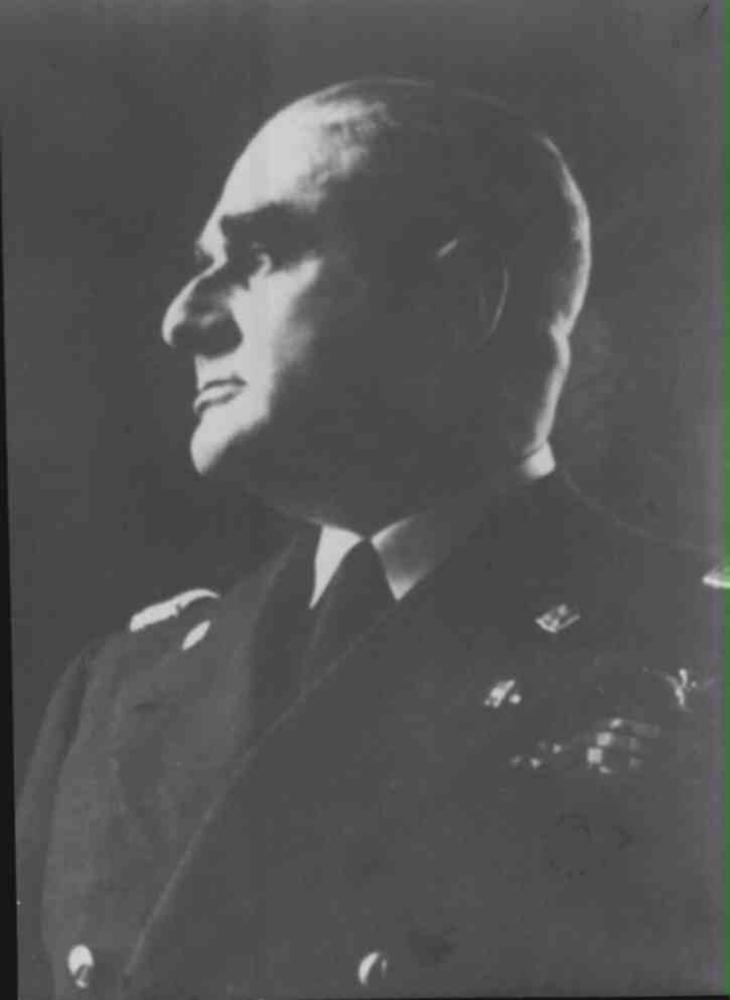

Undersecretary to the Presidency of the Council of Ministers of the Kingdom of Italy
- In office 31 October 1939 – 6 February 1943
- Preceded by: Giacomo Medici Del Vascello
- Succeeded by: Amilcare Rossi

Member of the Chamber of Deputies of the Kingdom of Italy
- In office 24 May 1924 – 21 January 1929

Member of the Chamber of Fasces and Corporations
- In office 23 March 1939 – 29 April 1943

Member of the Senate of the Kingdom of Italy
- In office 29 April 1943 – 22 March 1945

Prefect of Chieti
- In office 16 September 1927 – 1 August 1932
- Preceded by: Alberto Maroni
- Succeeded by: Guido Letta

Prefect of La Spezia
- In office 1 August 1932 – 25 July 1935
- Preceded by: Oscar Uccelli
- Succeeded by: Adalberto Mariano

Prefect of Forlì
- In office 25 July 1935 – 4 October 1935
- Preceded by: Dino Borri
- Succeeded by: Giuseppe Toffano

Personal details
- Born: 28 September 1882 Verona, Kingdom of Italy
- Died: 20 December 1964 (aged 82) Rome, Italy
- Party: National Fascist Party; Republican Fascist Party
- Civilian awards: Order of the Crown of Italy; Order of Saints Maurice and Lazarus; Colonial Order of the Star of Italy; Order of the Holy Sepulchre; Sovereign Military Order of Malta

Military service
- Allegiance: Kingdom of Italy
- Branch/service: Royal Italian Army; MVSN
- Rank: Colonel (Army); Major General (MVSN)
- Battles/wars: World War I; Battles of the Isonzo
- Military awards: Silver Medal of Military Valor; Military Order of Savoy; Cross of Military Merit

Luigi Russo (Verona, 28 September 1882 – Rome, 20 December 1964) was an Italian Fascist politician and civil servant, who served as Undersecretary to the Presidency of the Council of the Kingdom of Italy from 1939 to 1943. He was also Chief of Staff of the Volunteer Militia for National Security from 3 October 1935 to 3 November 1939.

== Biography ==
He participated in the First World War as a Bersaglieri officer, with the rank of captain and later major, being wounded and twice awarded the Silver Medal of Military Valor during the Tenth and Eleventh Battle of the Isonzo. Having ended the war with the rank of colonel, he was later a member of the National Directory of the National Veterans Association (of which he was later commissioner from 1925 to 1927). In 1922 he joined the National Fascist Party, with which he was elected to the Italian Chamber of Deputies in 1924. From 6 February to 22 September 1927 he served as podestà (mayor) of Udine, then as Prefect of Chieti (from 16 September 1927 to 1 August 1932), La Spezia (1 August 1932–25 July 1935) and Forlì (25 July–4 October 1935).

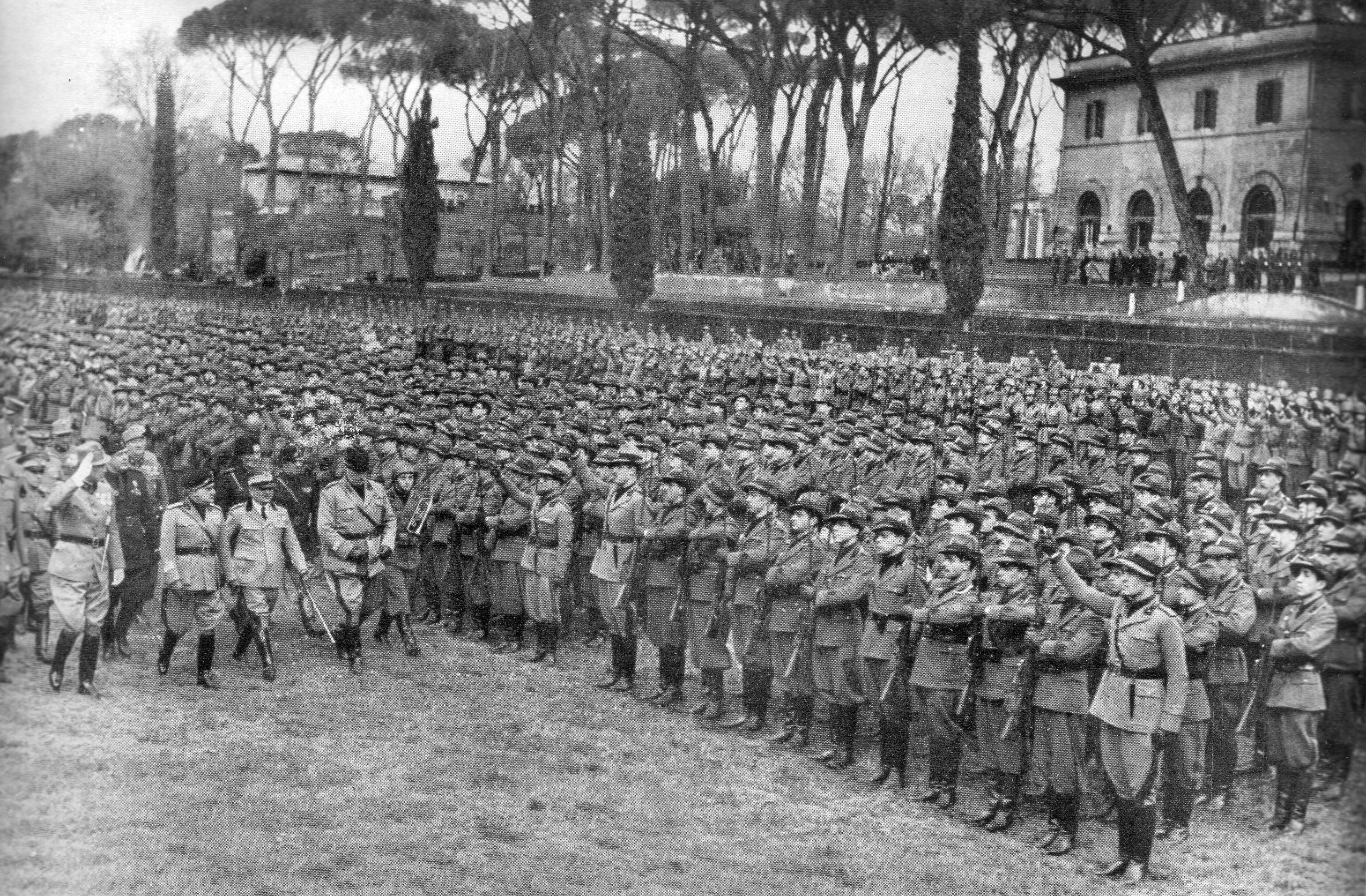
Russo and General Federico Baistrocchi reviewing a Blackshirt unit in Rome, March 1936

In 1923 he became console (colonel) in the Volunteer Militia for National Security, then console generale (brigadier general) in 1929 and luogotenente generale (major general) from January 1936; in 1935 he became Chief of Staff of the MVSN until 1939. He was also a member of the National Directorate of the PNF, and in 1939 he became a member of the Chamber of Fasces and Corporations. He was Undersecretary of State to the Presidency of the Council of Ministers of the Mussolini Cabinet from 31 October 1939 to 6 February 1943, after which he was appointed Senator of the Kingdom.

After the armistice of Cassibile he joined the Italian Social Republic, where he was commissioner of the National Veterans' Organisation. On 7 August 1944 he was referred to the High Court of Justice for Sanctions against Fascism, which on 22 March 1945 revoked his seat as senator; after the end of the war Russo appealed this sentence, but without success.

Government offices
Preceded by Attilio Teruzzi	Chief of Staff of the Volunteer Militia for National Security; 3 October 1935 – 3 November 1939	Succeeded by Achille Starace
