= Fall of the Fascist regime in Italy =

1943 deposition of Italian dictator Benito Mussolini

25 Luglio
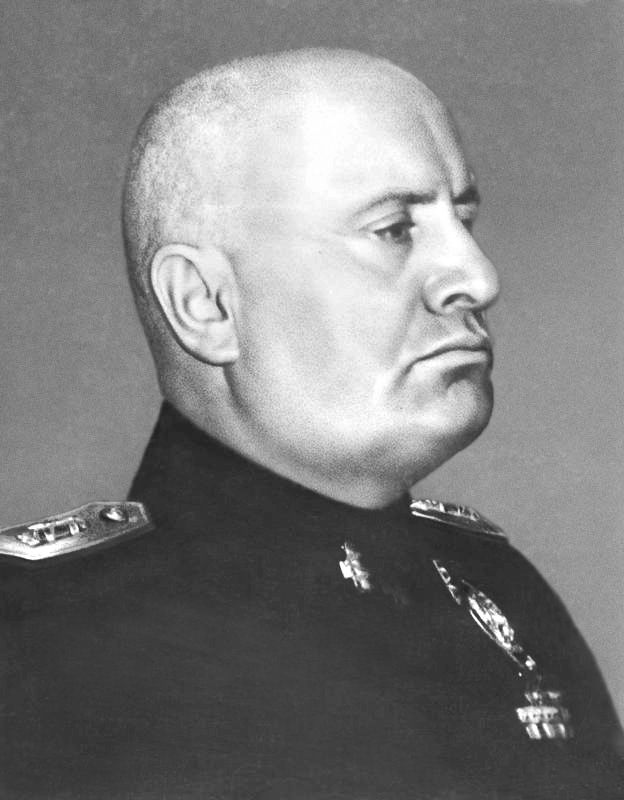
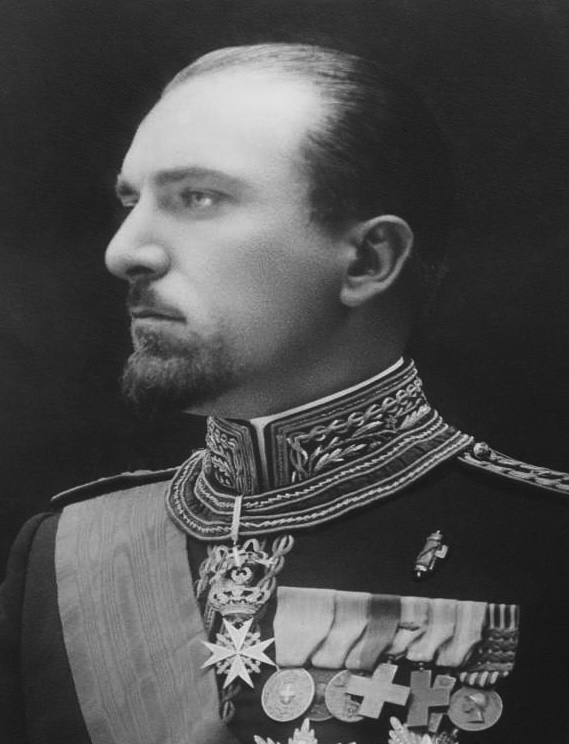
- Benito Mussolini and Dino Grandi
- Date: 24–25 July 1943
- Location: Rome, Italy
- Participants: Benito Mussolini; Duce of Fascism; Dino Grandi; President of the Chamber
- Outcome: Coup successful: Mussolini ousted and arrested under the orders of King Victor Emmanuel III.; Fall of the Mussolini government and appointment of Pietro Badoglio as new Prime Minister.; Start of negotiations for an armistice between Italy and the Allies.

The fall of the Fascist regime in Italy, also known in Italy as 25 Luglio (Italian: Venticinque Luglio, pronounced [ˌventiˈtʃiŋkwe ˈluʎʎo]; lit. '25 July'), came as a result of parallel plots led respectively by Dino Grandi and King Victor Emmanuel III during the spring and summer of 1943, culminating with a successful vote of no confidence against Prime Minister Benito Mussolini at the meeting of the Grand Council of Fascism on 24–25 July 1943. The vote, although significant, had no de jure value, since by law in the Italian constitutional monarchy the prime minister was responsible for his actions only to the king, who was the only one who could dismiss him. Nevertheless, a new government was established as a result, putting an end to the almost 21 years of Fascist rule in the Kingdom of Italy, and Mussolini was placed under arrest.

== Background ==
At the beginning of 1943, Italy was facing defeat. The collapse of the African front on 4 November 1942 and the Allied landings in North Africa on 8–12 November exposed Italy to an invasion by the Allied forces. The defeat of the Italian expeditionary force (ARMIR) in the Eastern Front, the heavy aerial bombings of the cities, and the lack of food and fuel demoralized the population, the majority of whom wanted to end the war and denounce the alliance with Nazi Germany. Italy needed German aid in order to maintain control of Tunisia, the last stronghold of the Axis powers in Africa. Italy's dictator, Benito Mussolini, was convinced that the war could be decided in the Mediterranean theater. On 29 April 1943, at the meeting in Klessheim, Adolf Hitler rejected Mussolini's proposition to seek a separate peace with Russia and move the bulk of the German Army south. The request for reinforcements to defend the Axis bridgehead in Tunisia was refused by the Wehrmacht, which no longer trusted the Italian will to maintain resistance. Mussolini's health was another major factor of uncertainty. He was depressed and sick after being diagnosed with gastritis and duodenitis of a nervous origin. Because of his illness, the Duce was often forced to stay at home, depriving Italy of effective government.

In this situation, several groups belonging to four different circles (the Royal Court, the anti-Fascist parties, the Fascists and the General Staff) began to look for a way out. Aristocrats, such as Crown Princess Marie-José, members of the upper class, and politicians belonging to the pre-Fascist elite, independently started plots to establish contact with the Allies. Following the declaration of Casablanca, the Allies would only accept unconditional surrender. Despite the Crown Princess' involvement, the Anglo-Americans expected a move from higher-placed personalities, like the King, and disregarded contact with these groups.

The anti-Fascist parties, weakened by 20 years of dictatorship, were still in an embryonic state. All except the Italian Communist Party and the republicans of the Partito d'Azione waited for a signal from King Victor Emmanuel III, whose inaction was prompted by his character, his fears and constitutional scruples, and the fact that the monarchy was likely to be doomed regardless of how the war turned out. The King felt considerable contempt for the pre-Fascist politicians, whom he ironically called "revenants" (i.e., "ghosts" or "zombies"). He was also distrustful of those who claimed that the Anglo-Americans would not seek revenge on Italy.

Victor Emmanuel III did retain his trust in Mussolini, and he hoped that the Duce could save the situation. The King kept his own counsel and isolated himself from anyone who tried to learn his intentions. General Vittorio Ambrosio, who was devoted to the King and hostile to the Germans, became the new Chief of the General Staff. Ambrosio was persuaded that the war was lost for Italy, but he never took personal initiative to change the situation without first consulting the King. Ambrosio, with the help of Giuseppe Castellano and Giacomo Carboni (both of whom would play an important part in the events leading to the Armistice of Cassibile of 8 September 1943), slowly proceeded to occupy several key positions in the armed forces with officials devoted to the King. He also tried to bring back from abroad as many as possible of Italy's forces, but it was difficult to do so without arousing suspicion in Germany.

On 6 February 1943, Mussolini carried out the most wide-ranging government reshuffle in 21 years of Fascist power. Almost all of the ministers were changed, including the Duce's son-in-law, Galeazzo Ciano, and Dino Grandi, Giuseppe Bottai, Guido Buffarini Guidi and Alessandro Pavolini. The situation was compromised and the primary goal of the operation, to placate public opinion about the Fascist Party, failed. Among the new appointments, the new Undersecretary of Foreign Affairs (the Duce took over the department himself) Giuseppe Bastianini, was aware of the seriousness of the situation. Bastianini's strategy was twofold: like Mussolini, he tried to argue in favor of a peace between Germany and the USSR. He also aimed to create a block of Balkan countries (the junior Axis partners Hungary, Romania and Bulgaria) led by Italy, which could act as a counterbalance to the excessive power of the German Reich in Europe. On 14 April, the Duce substituted the chief of police, Carmine Senise (a man of the King), with Lorenzo Chierici. Five days later Mussolini replaced the young and inexperienced secretary of the Party, Aldo Vidussoni, with Carlo Scorza, in an attempt to galvanize the Party.

In March 1943 a wave of strikes that began at the Fiat Mirafiori plant in Turin — the first mass strikes since the consolidation of the dictatorship — spread through the industrial cities of northern Italy. The regime proved able neither to suppress the movement quickly nor to satisfy its demands, and the episode demonstrated that it had lost the acquiescence of the industrial working class.

=== Loss of Tunis ===
The fall of Tunis on 13 May 1943 radically changed the strategic situation. It was important for Germany to control Italy, which had turned into an external stronghold of the Reich, because they were susceptible to invasion. The Germans developed plans for operations "Alarich" and "Konstantin", devoted respectively to the occupation of Italy and of the Balkan areas occupied by the Italian Army, in order to take control of Italy and disarm the Italian forces after their expected armistice with the Allies. In preparation, the Germans wanted to increase their land forces in Italy. Ambrosio and Mussolini refused and asked only for more airplanes, because they wanted to preserve Italian independence. On 11 June 1943, the Allies captured the island of Pantelleria, the first part of metropolitan Italy to be lost. Pantelleria had been turned into a citadel by Mussolini, but it fell to the Allies without much resistance after a week-long heavy bombardment. It was now apparent that the next Allied move would be the invasion of Sicily, Sardinia, Corsica or Greece.

King Victor Emmanuel III, citing formal respect for the constitution, insisted on a vote of no confidence as prerequisite before replacing Mussolini.

In mid-May, the King started to consider exiting the war after being persuaded by Duke Pietro d'Acquarone, Minister of the Royal House, who was worried about the future of the monarchy. Italian public opinion was starting to turn against the monarchy after the King's inaction. At the end of May, two high-ranking politicians of the pre-Fascist age, Ivanoe Bonomi and Marcello Soleri, were received by d'Acquarone and the King's aide-de-camp, Gen. Paolo Puntoni. On 2 and 8 June, they were received in audience by the King, where they pressed for the arrest of Mussolini and the nomination of a military government, but they were left frustrated by the monarchical inaction. On 30 June, Bonomi met Crown Prince Umberto and proposed three generals (Ambrosio, Marshal Pietro Badoglio and Enrico Caviglia) as Mussolini's potential successors. On 4 July, Badoglio was received by Umberto, who implied that the Crown was no longer opposed to a change in government. The following day, Ambrosio proposed that the King appoint Badoglio or Caviglia to head any government that replaced Mussolini. Caviglia, a high-ranking freemason, was considered too old for such a difficult task despite his anti-Fascist stance. Badoglio, who had resigned as Chief of the General Staff after the debacle of the invasion of Greece in 1941, had become a bitter enemy of Mussolini and wanted revenge. He was a personal friend of Duke d'Acquarone, who had been his aide-de-camp, and both – like Caviglia – were freemasons. A collaboration between the two Marshals was inconceivable because Caviglia hated Badoglio.

Dino Grandi, President of the Chamber of Deputies, was the man who organized the ousting of Mussolini.

On 4 June, the King received Dino Grandi, who was still president of the Chamber of Fasces and Corporations, despite being dropped from the cabinet. Grandi was one of the Fascist Party's top leaders, the gerarchi. Despite being a close colleague of Mussolini for over 20 years, he was more of a right-wing conservative than a Fascist. He viewed Fascism as an ephemeral phenomenon confined to the lifespan of Mussolini. Grandi had often been considered the most likely successor to the Duce because of his diplomatic experience as the former foreign minister and ambassador in the UK and his position as a staunch enemy of Germany with an extensive circle of friends in the British establishment. Regardless of his personal devotion to Mussolini, Grandi believed that the most effective way to serve him was to occasionally counteract his orders and give him the credit of any success. On 25 March 1943, Victor Emmanuel awarded him the highest royal honor, the collare dell'Annunziata, which gave him unrestricted access to the Royal House. During his last meeting with the King before 25 July, Grandi described his bold plan to eliminate Mussolini and attack the Germans. Grandi compared Victor Emmanuel to the 18th-century Duke of Savoy, Victor Amadeus II, who switched from the French to the Imperial alliance, rescuing the dynasty. All that the King needed was another Pietro Micca (the Savoyard soldier who became a national hero for his sacrifice in the defense of Turin in 1706 against the French), and Grandi proposed himself for this role. Victor Emmanuel countered that he was a constitutional monarch, so he could only move after a vote of the parliament or the Grand Council of Fascism. The King was opposed to making a sudden move that could be considered a betrayal. The King asked Grandi to ease his action by activating the parliament and the Grand Council and keeping his trust in him. Grandi returned to his hometown, Bologna, to await developments with the knowledge that the King was finally aware of the situation, while also anticipating his potential inaction.

On 19 June 1943, the last cabinet meeting of the Fascist age took place. The Minister of Communication, Senator Vittorio Cini, a powerful Italian industrialist, confronted Mussolini about finding a time and way to exit the war. Cini resigned after the meeting, which signaled the faltering of Mussolini's charisma even among his own entourage. People devoted to him, including OVRA agents and the Germans, consistently told him that several plots were going on. The Duce never reacted, telling each one that they were reading too many crime novels or were affected by persecution mania. On 24 June, Mussolini gave his last important speech as prime minister, known as the "boot topping" (bagnasciuga) speech. The Duce promised that the only part of Italy that the Anglo-Americans would be able to occupy was the shore-line. He was misspoken in his effort to say they would only occupy Italy as corpses, and he used incorrect vocabulary. For many Italians, his confused and incoherent speech was the final proof that something was wrong with Mussolini.

=== Landing in Sicily ===
On the night of 10 July the Allies landed in Sicily. Despite expecting the invasion, the Italian forces were overwhelmed after initial resistance, and like Augusta (the island's most fortified stronghold), they collapsed without fighting. Within days, it became apparent that Sicily was going to be lost. On 16 July, Bastianini went to Palazzo Venezia (the Duce's seat) to show Mussolini a telegram to be sent to Hitler where he reproached the Germans for not sending reinforcements. After the Duce's approval, the undersecretary asked for authorization to establish contacts with the Allies. Mussolini agreed, under the condition of not being directly involved. The secret emissary was the Vatican banker, Giovanni Fummi, who was supposed to reach London via Madrid or Lisbon. On the same evening, Bastianini crossed the Tiber to meet Cardinal Maglione, Vatican Secretary of State, who received a document explaining the Italian position about a possible unilateral exit from the war.

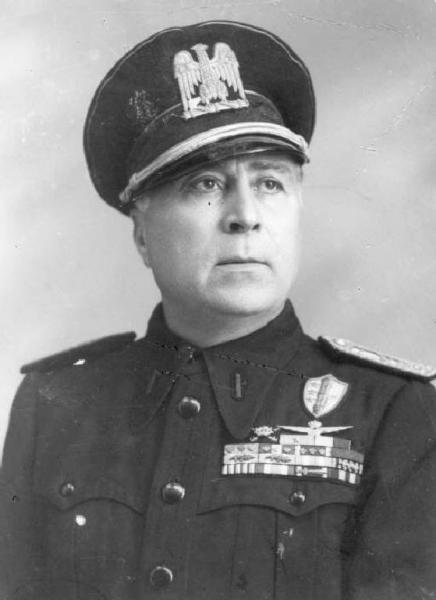
Roberto Farinacci, Ras of Cremona, a fascist hardliner, staunch ally of the Germans, and opponent of Grandi

After the fall of Tunis and Pantelleria, the majority of Italy believed that the war had been lost. The landing in Sicily accelerated the crisis, and the lack of resistance shocked the Fascists, who questioned why the Duce was not reacting. Those who looked to the King or Mussolini were at a standstill, and it was time for Italy to find an institution that was suitable to take political action.

Among the four existing state institutions, the Party, the Chamber of Fasces and Corporations, the Senate and the Grand Council, only the last two were suitable for action: the Senate because there were still quite a few anti- or pre-Fascist members, and the Grand Council since several members were against the Duce. A motion by 61 senators, on 22 July, asking to convene the Senate was blocked by Mussolini, and only Mussolini had the power to summon the Grand Council and determine its agenda. The only gerarca (except Roberto Farinacci, who started from opposite premises) with a clear plan of exit from the impasse was Dino Grandi. His idea was to depose Mussolini, let the King make a government without Fascists, and at the same time attack the German army in Italy. This could provide a chance that the declaration of Casablanca could be mitigated in the case of Italy. The new Party Secretary, Carlo Scorza, also developed his own plan. Like Farinacci, he thought the only solution was the political "embalming" of Mussolini and the pursuit of a total war. Farinacci acted in close cooperation with the Germans, but Scorza thought that the power should be assumed directly by the Party, which had been largely discredited in the previous few years. On 13 and 16 July, several Fascists led by Farinacci met in the main seat of the Party in Piazza Colonna and decided to go to Mussolini in Palazzo Venezia to ask for the convocation of the Grand Council. At the end of the meeting, Mussolini consented to convoke the supreme assembly of Fascism.

The group was divided: Farinacci and Scorza were for a totalitarian solution together with Germany, the others were in favor of giving the emergency war powers back to the King. Farinacci was isolated, and none of the moderate gerarchi had sufficient political clout to take the lead in such a situation. On 15 July, the King met Badoglio – who had declared to friends that he would organize a putsch with or without the King – and informed him that he would be the new head of government. Victor Emmanuel said that he was against a political government, and Badoglio should not seek an armistice in the first phase.

=== Meeting in Feltre ===
The fall of Sicily occurred in five weeks, and the armed forces appeared incapable of resisting an invasion of mainland Italy without massive German help. Mussolini wrote to Hitler to request a meeting to discuss the situation in Italy, but the letter was never sent since the Führer – who got daily reports on Italy from his ambassador to the Vatican and Himmler agent, Eugen Dollmann, and was worried about the apathy of the Duce and the ongoing Italian military catastrophe – asked him to meet as soon as possible.

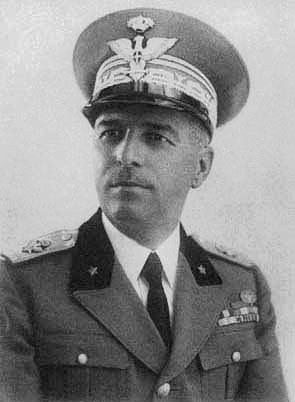
Before the meeting of Feltre, General Vittorio Ambrosio, Chief of the Comando Supremo, gave Mussolini two weeks to disengage Italy from Germany.

The meeting took place on 19 July in the villa of Senator Achille Gaggia in Feltre. Mussolini, Bastianini and Ambrosio met with Hitler and the generals of the German high command to discuss the situation and the possible countermeasures. The German delegation included several generals, but neither Göring nor Ribbentrop were present because the Germans were focusing on the military aspects of the situation. Ambrosio carefully prepared for the meeting, telling Mussolini that his duty was to exit the war in the next 15 days. The Germans had lost faith in the Italians and were only interested in occupying northern and central Italy, leaving the Italian army alone to defend the country from the Allies. They also proposed that the Axis supreme command in the peninsula be taken over by a German general, such as Erwin Rommel. Hitler began the meeting by blaming the Italians for their weak military performance and asking for draconian measures. The meeting was interrupted by an Italian aide telling Mussolini that the Allies were currently heavily bombing Rome for the first time. Ambrosio and Bastianini pressed the Duce to tell Hitler that a political solution to the war was necessary for Italy, but Mussolini said that he had been tormented for months by the dilemma of leaving the alliance or continuing the war. Mussolini struggled to overcome the sense of inferiority he felt in the presence of Hitler and to speak frankly with his German colleague. Eventually, the Duce interrupted the meeting, which was scheduled to last 3 days, to Hitler's chagrin. The delegations returned to Belluno via train and after Mussolini greeted Hitler in the afternoon, he returned to Rome by flying his personal aircraft where he could see that the eastern quarters of the city were still burning.

Grandi decided to move as a result of the inaction. On that same evening (19 July), he left Bologna with a first draft of his Order of the Day (Ordine del Giorno, OdG) which was supposed to be presented to the Grand Council. He was able to reach Rome just one day later, and on the morning of the 21st, he met Scorza, who told him that Mussolini had decided to convoke the Grand Council. It was finally the "gioco grosso", the great game, which Grandi had been waiting for.

== Two parallel plots ==
After the failure of the Feltre meeting and the first bombing of Rome, the crisis accelerated. The day after Feltre, 20 July, Mussolini met Ambrosio twice. During the second meeting, the Duce told him that he had decided to write to Hitler, confessing the need for Italy to abandon the alliance. Ambrosio was still angry about the missed opportunity to do this in Feltre and offered his resignation to the Duce, who rejected it. Mussolini was now useless for Ambrosio. Therefore, Ambrosio decided to set the putsch in motion.

At the same time, Grandi and Luigi Federzoni, his close ally and Italian nationalist leader, were trying to estimate how many among the 27 members of the Grand Council would vote for his document. They concluded that of the 27 members, 4 were for it, 7 against and 16 undecided. Grandi could not reveal to his colleagues the real consequences of the approval of his OdG: the dismissal of Mussolini, the end of the Fascist Party, and war against Germany. Only a couple of gerarchi had the necessary political intelligence to understand it. The rest were still hopeful that the Duce, who had made their decisions for the last 21 years, could once again produce a miracle. Consequently, Grandi decided to write his OdG in a vague form and leave it open to interpretation. The OdG was divided into three parts. It began with a long, rhetorical appeal to the nation and the armed forces, praising them for their resistance to the invaders. In the second part, the document asked for the restoration of the pre-Fascist institutions and laws. The end of the document was an appeal to the King; he should assume supreme civil and military power according to Article 5 of the constitution of the kingdom. Grandi believed that the approval of the OdG would be the signal that the King was waiting for. On 21 July, Mussolini ordered Scorza to convoke the Grand Council, and he sent the invitation one day later. Grandi went to Scorza and explained his OdG on the same day, who agreed to support it. Scorza asked Grandi for a copy of his document, and he met Mussolini and showed him the OdG the next day. The Duce called it a "not admissible and cowardly" document. Afterwards, Scorza secretly prepared another OdG, similar to that of Grandi, but which asked for the concentration of power in the Fascist Party.

On 22 July, the King met with Mussolini, who wanted to report the outcome of Feltre. According to Badoglio, Mussolini promised the King that he would disengage Italy from the war by 15 September. The two-month delay can be explained by the fact that Bastianini had begun contact with the Allies which would need time to proceed, and Mussolini needed time to justify himself and Italy before the world for his betrayal. According to Badoglio, the King agreed with Mussolini, which is why the Duce was not worried about the outcome of the Grand Council meeting. A coup d'état was destined to fail without the aid of the King. At the end of the meeting, Mussolini was convinced that the King would stand by his side, and Victor Emmanuel was disappointed after telling him in vain that he should resign. The King was forced now to consider the putsch seriously, as he knew that Bastianini was trying to contact the Allies while Farinacci, the fascist hardliner, was organizing a putsch to depose him and Mussolini and bring Italy under direct German control. The real decision was made after knowing that the Grand Council had approved Grandi's OdG.

At 17:30 on the same day, Grandi went to Palazzo Venezia under the official reason of presenting a new book about the Italian participation in the non-intervention committee in Spain to Mussolini. The meeting was scheduled to last 15 minutes, but it was prolonged until 18:45. The chief of police and the German Feldmarschall Kesselring were waiting to be received by the Duce. Mussolini later denied that he spoke with Grandi about the OdG, but it is apparent that Grandi, who loved the Duce, explained to him the consequences of his OdG and gave him a chance to save face and resign before the vote. In that case, the Grand Council's meeting would have been superfluous. Mussolini listened while Grandi was explaining the necessity of resigning to avoid a catastrophe, but at the end rebuked him saying that his conclusions were wrong since Germany was about to produce a decisive secret weapon. After that, Mussolini met Kesselring and the chief of police, Chierici, whom he confided in that it would have been easy to bring Grandi, Bottai and Ciano back to the fold as they were eager to be persuaded by him. On 23 July, Mussolini accepted the resignation of Cini, which was supposed to be a signal to his opponents. At the same time, Grandi, Federzoni, de Marsico (one of the best jurists in Italy), Bottai and Ciano modified the OdG by removing the interpretative introduction which explained the functions of the Grand Council. This demonstrated that the assembly had the constitutional power to remove Mussolini. According to the constitutionalists, the Leggi Fascistissime of December 1925 bent the Constitution, but did not break it. Because of these laws, the Duce ruled the country on behalf of the King, who always remained the source of executive power. If the Grand Council, which was the trait d'union between Fascism and the state, passed a vote of no confidence on the dictator, the King would have been entitled to remove him and nominate his successor. Ciano was acquainted with the OdG by Bottai, and Grandi was reluctant to accept him since he was the son-in-law of Mussolini and known for his superficial and inconstant character. However, Ciano insisted, unaware that this decision would provoke his death six months later in Verona. After that, Grandi had Farinacci visit his office in the parliament to show him his OdG. Farinacci told Grandi that he accepted the first part of the document, but that he did not agree with the rest: the military powers had to be given to the Germans, and Italy should start to fight the war by getting rid of Mussolini and the generals. Farinacci asked him for a copy of his OdG, and like Scorza, he used it to produce another OdG of his own. In the time left before the meeting, Grandi contacted other participants asking them to join his action.

== Events of 24–25 July 1943 ==
Grandi's Order of the Day

The Grand Council of Fascism,

meeting in these hours of utmost trial, turns all its thoughts to the heroic fighters in every corps who, side by side with the people of Sicily in whom shines the unequivocal faith of the Italian people, renewing the noble traditions of strenuous valor and the indomitable spirit of sacrifice of our glorious Armed Forces, having examined the internal and international situation and the war's political and military leadership,

proclaims

the sacred duty for all Italians to defend at all costs the homeland's unity, independence, and freedom, the fruits of sacrifice and the efforts of four generations from the Risorgimento to the present, the life and future of the Italian people;

affirms

the necessity of moral and material unity of all Italians in this serious and decisive hour for the nation's destiny;

declares

that to this end the immediate restoration of all state functions is necessary, assigning to the Crown, to the Grand Council, to the government, to the Parliament, and to the corporate groups the duties and responsibility established by our statutory and constitutional laws;

invites

the government to beseech His Majesty the king, to whom turns the loyal and trusting heart of the whole nation, to assume effective command of the Armed Forces of land, sea, and air for the honor and salvation of the homeland, under article 5 of the Constitution, the supreme initiative that our institutions assign to him, and which have always been throughout our nation's history the glorious heritage of our august House of Savoy.

— Dino Grandi,

=== Night of the Grand Council ===
At 17:00 on 24 July 1943, the 28 members of the Grand Council met in the parrot room (the anteroom of the globe saloon, the office of Mussolini) in Palazzo Venezia. For the first time in the history of the Grand Council, neither the bodyguard of Mussolini, known as the Moschettieri del Duce, nor a detachment of the "M" battalions, were present in the Renaissance palace. Fully armed blackshirts occupied the yard, the escalade and the antechamber. Mussolini did not want a stenographer, so no minutes of the meeting were taken.

Grandi brought two hidden Breda hand grenades with him, in addition to revising his will and going to confession before the meeting, because he was under the impression that he might not leave the palace alive. Mussolini began the meeting by summarizing the history of the supreme command, trying to prove that the attribution to him had been sponsored by Badoglio. He summarized the war events in the previous months, saying that he was ready to move the government to the Po Valley. He concluded by asking the participants to give their personal opinion about what he called "il dilemma": the choice between war or peace. The Duce knew that, except for the three or four men who were plotting against him, the "swamp" was undecided. He hoped that he could convince them to vote for the OdG Scorza, which gave only the military powers back to the King. After the Duce's introduction, De Bono (one of the two remaining living quadrumvirs) spoke, followed by Farinacci and De Vecchi (the other quadrumvir).

Grandi then read out and explained the meaning of his document, concluding his speech with Mussolini's citation: "Let perish all the factions, so that the Nation can live". Next, Farinacci explained that his criticism ran opposite to Grandi's. While Grandi contended that Mussolini had betrayed the constitution, the real victim of betrayal was Fascism. Farinacci said that in order to win the war, it was necessary to wipe out the democrats and the liberals who were still nested in the Party, as well as the generals. He wanted to give the supreme command of the armed forces back to the King and unify Italy's direction of the war with Germany's, all of which would strengthen the Party. At the end of his speech, he read his proposed OdG, which summarized all of these points. After some minor interventions, Bottai, the Fascist intellectual, made a purely political speech defending the OdG. This was followed by Ciano's summary of the history of the alliance with the Germans, and his declaration that the Italians were not the traitors, instead, they were the people who were betrayed. At 23:30, the Duce announced that, due to the length of the meeting, some comrades had asked for a postponement to the next day. At this point, Grandi called for a vote on his OdG, saying that it was shameful to go to sleep when Italian soldiers were dying for their fatherland. Never before in the 20-year history of the assembly had anyone asked for a vote. Since fascism was strongly anti-parliamentary, in all previous meetings only discussions summarized by the Duce had taken place. Mussolini unwillingly agreed, and at midnight the meeting was suspended for 10 minutes. In the meantime, Grandi collected the signatures to his OdG.

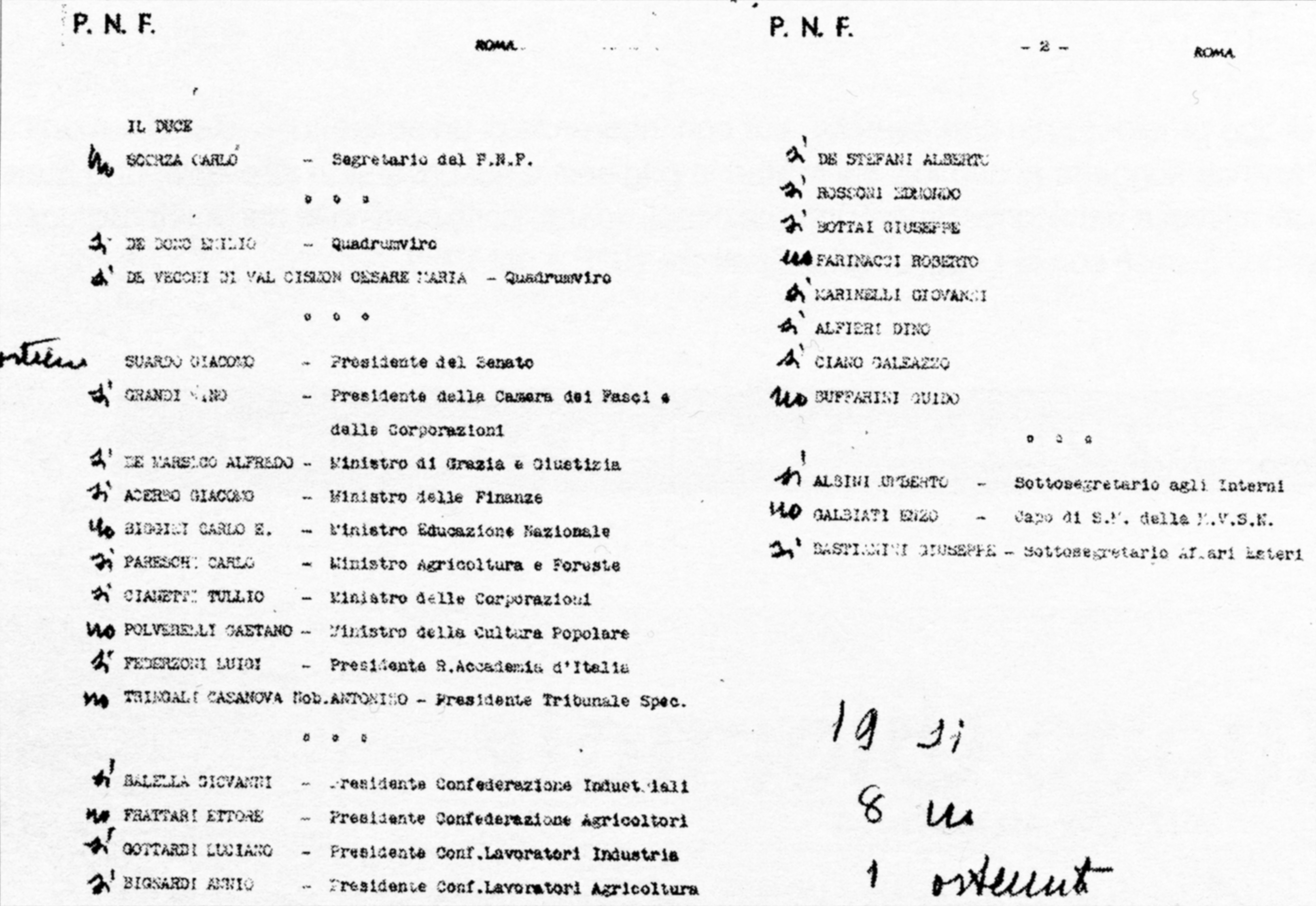
The list of Fascist officials who supported or voted against the ousting of Mussolini

After other interventions for and against the OdG, Mussolini told the participants to reflect on their decision since the approval of Grandi's OdG would imply the end of Fascism. He also cautioned against the illusion that the Anglo-Americans would be content with that, because what they really wanted was the end of Italy, which had become too strong under his rule. He said this was not about him, because he was sure that the war could be won. He had a "key" to accomplish that but he could not disclose it, and he was not willing to let his throat be cut by the King. If the King would re-confirm his trust in him, the consequences for the supporters of Grandi's OdG would be dire. At the end of his speech, many of the gerarchi were visibly shaken. Grandi said that the Duce was blackmailing all of them, and if one must choose between fidelity to him and loyalty to the homeland, the choice was clear. At this point, Scorza caught everyone by surprise by presenting his own OdG. This proposed the nomination of the three war and interior ministers, all under Mussolini, and the concentration of power in the hands of the Fascist Party.

His speech hurt the Duce's hopes of defeating Grandi since the Party was discredited among almost all the high-ranking Fascists. At the end of Scorza's intervention, Suardo announced that he was withdrawing his signature from the OdG Grandi and proposed to unify the three documents. Ciano asked Farinacci to withdraw his OdG and to ask Grandi to unify their two documents, but Farinacci refused. Bottai said that voting for Grandi had become a matter of honor. After other interventions and nine hours of discussion, Mussolini declared the meeting closed at two o'clock in the morning and ordered Scorza to proceed with the vote. They voted on the OdG Grandi first since it had the most proponents. Scorza was the first to vote, saying "no". After him, Marshal de Bono said "yes" and towed the undecided with him. In the end, the OdG Grandi obtained 19 votes for, with 8 against. Mussolini declared the document approved and asked who should bring the result to the King. Grandi answered: "You". The Duce concluded: "You provoked the regime crisis". After that, Scorza tried to call the saluto al duce but Mussolini stopped him.

While all the other gerarchi left the palace, Mussolini remained with Scorza to discuss the legal value of the OdG. They concluded that it was just a "recommendation" to the King. Scorza suggested that Mussolini accept the OdG Grandi, but he refused since he would have found himself against his allies in the Grand Council. After that, before reaching his wife in Villa Torlonia, Mussolini telephoned his mistress, Claretta Petacci. During his conversation, which was bugged, he told her in desperation: "We arrived to the epilogue, the greatest watershed in history"; "The star darkened"; "It's all over now". Afterwards, Scorza accompanied the Duce to Villa Torlonia at 03:00 on Sunday 25 July 1943.

=== Arrest of Mussolini ===
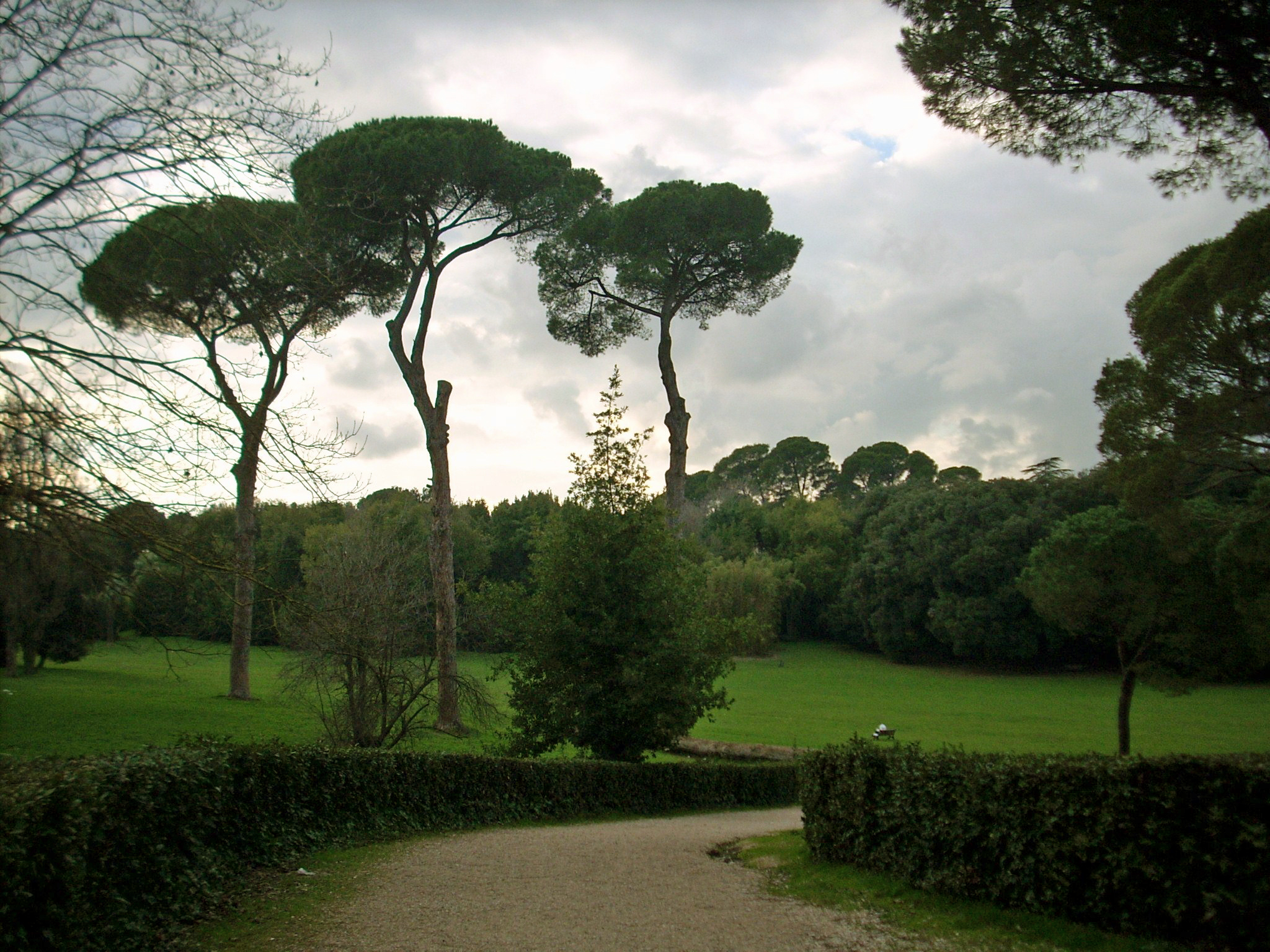
The park of Villa Savoia (now Villa Ada) in Rome. Mussolini was arrested there in the afternoon of 25 July 1943.

Grandi met with Pietro d'Acquarone until 06:00 after the Grand Council meeting to give him one of the two copies of the OdG. At 07:00, d'Acquarone informed the King. The King called Badoglio and told him that he would be the successor to Mussolini. The operation was due to start on 29 July. Mussolini went to work and found a letter on his desk from Tullio Cianetti, withdrawing his vote for the OdG Grandi. He ordered a search for Grandi from his office at Montecitorio, but he replied that he was not in Rome, potentially in an effort to give him the task of making contact with the Allies to prepare an armistice. Mussolini contacted the royal household in order to request an audience with the King to report on the previous night's meeting. This call unsettled the King, who had decided to arrest the Duce on that same day. The arrest occurred at 17:00 at Villa Savoia.

General Castellano contacted the Commander-General of the Carabinieri, General Angelo Cerica, who organized the arrest. Lieutenant Colonel Giovanni Frignani oversaw the arrest of Mussolini by order of the king. Captain Paolo Vigneri of the Carabinieri was commissioned to carry out the arrest. He was summoned by telephone with his colleague Captain Raffaele Aversa around 14:00 on 25 July by Lieutenant Colonel Frignani, who explored their method of carrying out the order of arrest issued against the Duce. Vigneri was told to deliver Mussolini and complete the mission at any cost.

In the meantime, Mussolini met the Japanese ambassador, Shinrokuro Hidaka, who had been waiting three weeks for a courtesy hearing. Hidaka heard Mussolini request that the Japanese Prime Minister, General Hideki Tojo, contact Hitler and convince him to reach an agreement with Stalin. Otherwise, Italy would be forced to abandon the alliance. In the afternoon, Mussolini visited the San Lorenzo quarter to observe the damage from the bombing. Back at Villa Torlonia, his wife, Donna Rachele, told him not to go to the appointment with the King since Victor Emmanuel could not be trusted. She told him: "You won’t be back", but he said that the King was his best friend.

At 17:00, Mussolini, escorted by agents of the presidenziale, arrived at the Villa Savoia where the King was waiting for him. He brought a copy of the law of the Grand Council, the OdG Grandi, and the letter of Cianetti. The Duce tried to convince Victor Emmanuel that the OdG had no legal value and that many of its supporters had changed their minds. The King told him that the country was broken, and the situation required him to quit his post; the new President of the Council of Ministers would be Marshal Badoglio. Mussolini feared for his future, but the King assured him that he would personally take care of his security and that of his family. Victor Emmanuel accompanied him to the door where he met Captain Vigneri. The Duce went to his car, but Captain Vigneri told him to go to a nearby ambulance for his security. Mussolini said there was no need for that, but followed him to the ambulance where the policemen were waiting. The ambulance left the park and rushed through Rome until reaching the "Podgora" army barracks in Trastevere before ultimately being moved to the "Legnano" Carabinieri barracks in Prati. The Duce received a kind letter from Badoglio the same night, explaining the necessity of his custody and asking him where he wanted to be brought. Mussolini asked to go to his summer residence, the Rocca delle Caminate, in Romagna, and he wrote to Badoglio that he was gladly willing to help him and his government. A transfer to his summer residence was not an option, and two days later he was accompanied to Gaeta, where the corvette Persefone brought him to the island of Ponza. He was transferred to the island of La Maddalena, and finally to Campo Imperatore, where he remained until 12 September 1943 when a German commando unit led by Otto Skorzeny freed him.

In the meantime, all the telephone centrals were blocked. The new chief of the police, Senise, who was appointed at 17:30 by Duke d’Acquarone, ordered the questore of Rome to arrest all the gerarchi present in the capital. The EIAR, linked with the headquarters of the MVSN (the Blackshirts), was also isolated. The King had his first meeting with Badoglio. At 18:00, the Secretary of the Party, Scorza, was waiting to meet Mussolini and seeing that he did not come, he went to the headquarters of the Carabinieri. There he was arrested by Cerica, but released on his word after promising that both he and the Fascist party would be faithful to the new government. The same fate befell the MVSN: its Chief of Staff, Lieutenant General Enzo Galbiati, advised Mussolini to arrest the 19 gerarchi who voted for the OdG Grandi, but he refused. After knowing about the arrest of Mussolini, he observed that the MVSN headquarters in Viale Romania had been surrounded by army units. Galbiati then ordered his men not to provoke incidents. Although the majority of his officers wanted to react, he called the Undersecretary to the Interior, Umberto Albini, after consulting with four generals and declaring that the MVSN would have "remained faithful to its principles, that is to serve the fatherland through its pair, Duce and King". Since the war against the Allies was continuing, the duty of each Blackshirt was to continue the fight. Badoglio had nothing to fear from the Blackshirts. Immediately, Galbiati was replaced by Quirino Armellini, an Army general, and arrested a few days later. The MVSN was then integrated into the Regio Esercito and disbanded.

=== Announcement and Italian public reaction ===
Attention. Attention. His Majesty the King and Emperor has accepted the resignation from office of the Head of Government, Prime Minister, and Secretary of State His Excellency il Cavaliere Benito Mussolini, and has named as Head of Government, Prime Minister, and Secretary of State the Marshal of Italy, Sir Pietro Badoglio.

— G. Arista, 25 July 1943

At 22:45 on 25 July 1943, Titta Arista (nicknamed the "voce littoria") announced that Mussolini had resigned and that Badoglio was the new premier. The communique finished with the words: "La guerra continua. L'Italia tiene fede alla parola data" ("The war goes on. Italy will be true to its word"). After the end of the transmission, the population slowly became aware of the resulting political situation. Thus Paolo Monelli, writer and journalist, describes what happened in the capital:

The silence of the summer night is broken by songs, screams, clamors. A group exited by Caffè Aragno climbs up Via del Tritone screaming with a crazy explosion: "Citizens, wake up, they arrested Mussolini, Mussolini to death, down with Fascism!" It sounded like the scream of a mute who gets his voice back after twenty years. Windows illuminate violently, front doors burst open, houses empty, all are out embracing each other, telling each other the news, with those simple and exuberant gestures belonging to people overwhelmed by emotion. Hotheads throw themselves on the ones still wearing the Fascist pin, tearing it away, trampling on it. "Off with the bug!" Columns of people go to acclaim the king at the Quirinal, Badoglio at Via XX Settembre.

Across Italy, men and women went outside and chiseled away the Fascist emblems and removed propaganda posters from the buildings. In Rome, the government detained high-ranking Fascists in Forte Boccea, Rome's military jail at the time. The lack of violence was remarkable; the people's revenge was mostly limited to tearing off the "bug", the Fascist pin, from the jackets of the Fascists or forcing them to toast to Badoglio.

In reference to the rapid and bloodless fall of the long-lasting regime, Italian intellectual Ranuccio Bianchi Bandinelli wrote in his diary at the time: "Behind the façade there was nothing. The first actor took his large cardboard head off and his idiot servants could be sent home with a cuff".

== Aftermath ==
=== German reaction ===
The Germans received news about Mussolini's arrest around 19:30 and informed Berlin immediately. The Führer was infuriated. Farinacci went to the German embassy, where Kesselring suggested that he join the armored Division "M", a group of devoted Fascists. They were encamped at Monterotondo where it could have been possible to march on Rome and free the Duce. Farinacci refused and asked to be brought to Germany. He left Italy by plane from Frascati and landed in Munich. Units of the 44th Infantry Division and of the 36th Mountain Brigade of the German Army broke through the Brenner, Reschen and Toblach passes, occupying South Tyrol. Other German units also penetrated Italy from the Julian and Piedmontese borders. The trains transporting the troops were covered in praise for and images of Mussolini. From 26 July until 8 August, eight German divisions and one brigade were moved without Italian consent to northern and central Italy – the same troops that Hitler had denied to Mussolini two weeks before in Feltre.

=== "Forty-six days", armistice, and civil war ===
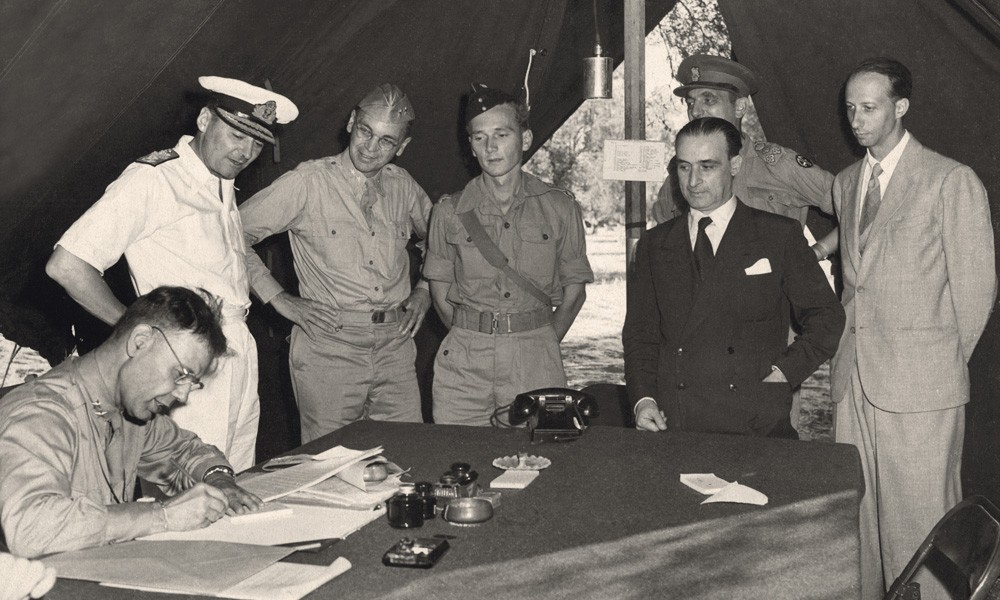
General Walter Bedell Smith signing the armistice with General Giuseppe Castellano and other Allied officers, in the Fairfield military camp in Cassibile

The forty-six days from the arrest of Mussolini on 25 July to the public notification on 8 September of the Armistice of Cassibile (signed 3 September, kept secret from the Italian people and from Italy's Nazi German allies) would set in motion numerous actions in Italy. The last sentence of the communiqué of 25 July ("The war goes on. Italy will be true to its word"), while puzzling to the Allies, did not deceive Hitler, who immediately understood that the change of regime would very likely lead to an Italian defection, which would endanger the German forces fighting in Southern Italy and the entire Wehrmacht presence in Southern Europe. However, the Badoglio government initially made no attempt to establish contact with the Anglo-Americans, while making alternating requests for help and obstructionism towards incoming German forces and requests to deploy German divisions in the South, on the frontline against the Allies. Germany increased troop movements into Italy, ostensibly done to support Italy against Allied troop movements from Southern Italy. The new foreign minister, Guariglia, was ambassador to Turkey, and time was lost while waiting for his return from Ankara. The King, after his activism on 25 July, was inactive, delegating the political action to d'Acquarone and Badoglio.

After letting the populace celebrate on 25 July, the Badoglio government proclaimed a state of siege and a curfew on 26 July. On 27 July, the first council of ministers under Badoglio took place. In this meeting, it was decided to move Mussolini ("The State prisoner") to an island and to dissolve the Fascist Party, the Grand Council, the Chamber of Fasci and Corporations, and the Special Tribunal for the Defense of the State. The reconstitution of all political parties was also forbidden. Despite this prohibition, representatives of the political parties met on 26 July in Milan and on 27 July in Rome under the direction of Ivanoe Bonomi. They met again in Rome on 2 August. Members of Christian Democracy, the Italian Liberal Party, the Italian Socialist Party, the Action Party, and the Italian Communist Party started to organize a common action against the government; at the same time, several demonstrations against Badoglio resulted in 83 deaths and several hundreds wounded around the country.

Grandi transmitted an account of the 2 August meeting to the foreign press representative on Sunday morning, but he knew it was blocked. Grandi understood that the new government wanted to let the Fascist contribution to the fall of Mussolini fade away. He convoked the ambassadors of Spain and Switzerland, who were eager to get a first-hand account, to his office in Montecitorio under the sole request that his account be published in the press. After the publication of the meeting in the Swiss press the next day, he met with Duke d'Acquarone, with whom he had an argument. Grandi later met the King, Badoglio and the Pope, proposing to be secretly sent to Madrid where he could meet his old friend Samuel Hoare, the British ambassador in Spain. He wanted to talk about Italy's surrender. The Germans were informed about his visit to Pius XII, and the Gestapo was tracing him. On 31 July, he met the new foreign minister, Guariglia, but Guariglia was not in a hurry to send him to Madrid.

The conflicting actions of the Badoglio government over the forty-six days, especially the Armistice of Cassibile with the Allies, would bring about the national catastrophe of 8 September: the meltdown of the armed forces in the face of the German Operation Achse designed to disarm them, occupying all of central and northern Italy by 19 September; the 9 September missing defense of Rome and flight of the royal family and the government; the 12 September freeing of Mussolini with the Gran Sasso raid; the 23 September establishment of the Italian Social Republic; and the commencement of the Italian Civil War.

== See also ==
- 1944 Romanian coup d'état
- Military history of Italy during World War II
- Operation Valkyrie

== Sources ==
- Bianchi, Gianfranco (1963). 25 Luglio: crollo di un regime [July 25: Collapse of a Regime] (in Italian). Milano: Mursia.
- Bottai, Giuseppe (1963). Diario 1935–1944 (in Italian) (1st ed.). Milan: Rizzolio.
- De Felice, Renzo (1996). Mussolini. L'Alleato. 1: L'Italia in guerra II: Crisi e agonia del regime [Mussolini. The Ally. 1: Italy at War II: The Crisis and Agony of the Regime] (in Italian) (2nd ed.). Torino: Einaudi. ISBN 8-8061-9569-7.
- De Felice, Renzo (2008). Mussolini. L'Alleato. 2: La Guerra Civile (in Italian) (3rd ed.). Torino: Einaudi. ISBN 978-8-8061-9571-7.
- Grandi, Dino (1983). De Felice, Renzo (ed.). Il 25 Luglio 40 anni dopo [July 25th 40 years later] (in Italian) (3rd ed.). Bologna: Il Mulino. ISBN 8-8150-0331-2.
- Monelli, Paolo (1946). Roma 1943 (in Italian) (4th ed.). Roma: Migliaresi.
