= Asclepia Gandolfo =

Italian military officer

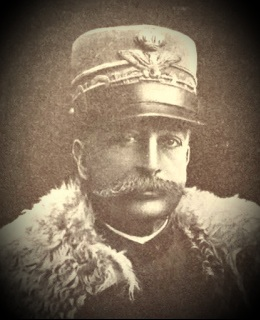
- Born: July 22, 1864; Imperia, Province of Imperia
- Died: August 31, 1925 (aged 61); Rome
- Spouse(s): Maria Martini (m. 1894; died 1895) Teresa Manfredi (m. 1905)
- Military career
- Allegiance: Kingdom of Italy
- Branch: Royal Italian Army
- Service years: 1885–1920; 1924–1925
- Rank: Army corps general
- Conflicts: World War I
- Awards: Order of Saints Maurice and Lazarus
- Other work: Commander of the Voluntary Militia for National Security (MVSN)

Asclepia Gandolfo (22 July 1864 in Imperia – 31 August 1925 in Rome) was an Italian military officer, who served as a general in the Royal Italian Army.

== Biography ==
Gandolfo was commissioned into the Royal Italian Army as a second lieutenant in 1885, after graduating from the Military Academy of Modena. He became a captain in the Bersaglieri in 1898, and in 1907 he was, as commander of the I Cyclist Battalion, among the promoters of Cyclist Battalions (bicycle infantry). At the outbreak of World War I, as lieutenant colonel he was placed in command of the 10th Infantry Regiment. In 1916 he obtained the Medal of Military Valor and promotion to major general with the command of the Pisa Brigade. In 1917 he commanded the 31st Division. In June 1918 he was promoted to lieutenant general and commander of the VIII Army Corps.

In Fiume (now Rijeka, Croatia) in September 1919 he refused to have Gabriele D'Annunzio's legionaries shot by his troops during the Impresa di Fiume. For this reason, in 1920 the government of Prime Minister Francesco Saverio Nitti transferred him to the reserve. In 1921 he joined the National Fascist Party (PNF).

At his residence in Oneglia, the first regulation of the Voluntary Militia for National Security (MVSN) (the paramilitary wing of the PNF) was drawn up together with Italo Balbo, Dino Perrone Compagni and Ulisse Igliori.

Member of the Grand Council of Fascism, in January 1923 he was appointed prefect of Cagliari by Benito Mussolini, and in May 1924 he returned to the ranks of the army, and promoted to army corps general.

He served as commander of the MVSN from 1 December 1924 until his death on 31 August 1925.

=== Freemasonry ===
He was a Freemason, and was part of the "Giuseppe Mazzini" lodge of Sanremo, "but resigned because it was so republican that the presence of military personnel was impossible".

=== Personal life ===
Gandolfo was married to Maria Martini in 1894, he was widowed the following year, and in 1905 he remarried with Teresa Manfredi.

== Decorations ==
Grand Officer of the Order of Saints Maurice and Lazarus (1925)
Knight of the Order of Saints Maurice and Lazarus (1919)
Officer of the Military Order of Savoy (1919)
Cavalier of the Military Order of Savoy (1916)
Medal of Military Valor (1916)

== See also ==
- List of senior officers of the Blackshirts
