= Achille Starace =

Italian Fascist leader (1889–1945)

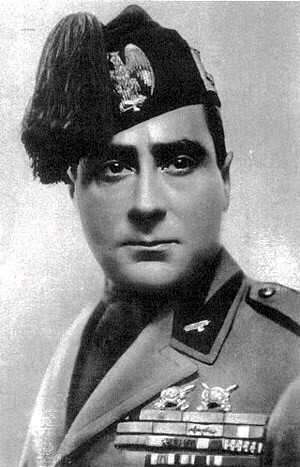

Secretary of the National Fascist Party
- In office 12 December 1931 – 31 October 1939
- Leader: Benito Mussolini
- Preceded by: Giovanni Giuriati
- Succeeded by: Ettore Muti

President of the Italian National Olympic Committee
- In office 5 May 1933 – 31 October 1939
- Preceded by: Leandro Arpinati
- Succeeded by: Rino Parenti

Personal details
- Born: 18 August 1889 Gallipoli, Apulia, Kingdom of Italy
- Died: 29 April 1945 (aged 55) Milan, Italian Social Republic
- Party: National Fascist Party

Achille Starace (Italian pronunciation: [aˈkille staˈraːtʃe]; 18 August 1889 – 29 April 1945) was an Italian military officer, politician, and sports manager. In his career, he served as the secretary of the National Fascist Party (1931–1939) and the president of the Italian National Olympic Committee (1933–1939), along with being a lieutenant general of the Blackshirts.

== Early life and career ==
Starace was born in Gallipoli, province of Lecce, in southern Apulia. His father was a wine and oil merchant.

Starace attended the Lecce Technical Institute and earned a degree in accounting. In 1909 he joined the Italian Royal Army and by 1912 had become a second lieutenant (sottotenente) of the Bersaglieri. A dedicated bellicist, he entered singlehanded in a brawl with pacifist demonstrators at the Biffi Cafe in Milan in August 1914 and gained quite a reputation by this action.

Seeing action during World War I, Starace was highly decorated for his service, winning one Silver Medal of Military Valor plus four bronze. After the war, he left the army and moved to Trento, where he first came into contact with the growing Fascist movement. He also joined the Freemason lodge La Vedetta ("The Sentinel") in Udine in March 1917.

An ardent nationalist, Starace joined the Fascist movement in Trento in 1920 and quickly became its local political secretary. In 1921, his efforts caught the attention of Benito Mussolini, who put Starace in charge of the Fascist organization in Venezia Tridentina. In October 1921, Starace became vice-secretary of the National Fascist Party (Partito Nazionale Fascista, or PNF). In 1922, Starace participated in the March on Rome, leading a squad of Blackshirts in support of Mussolini.

== Prominence ==
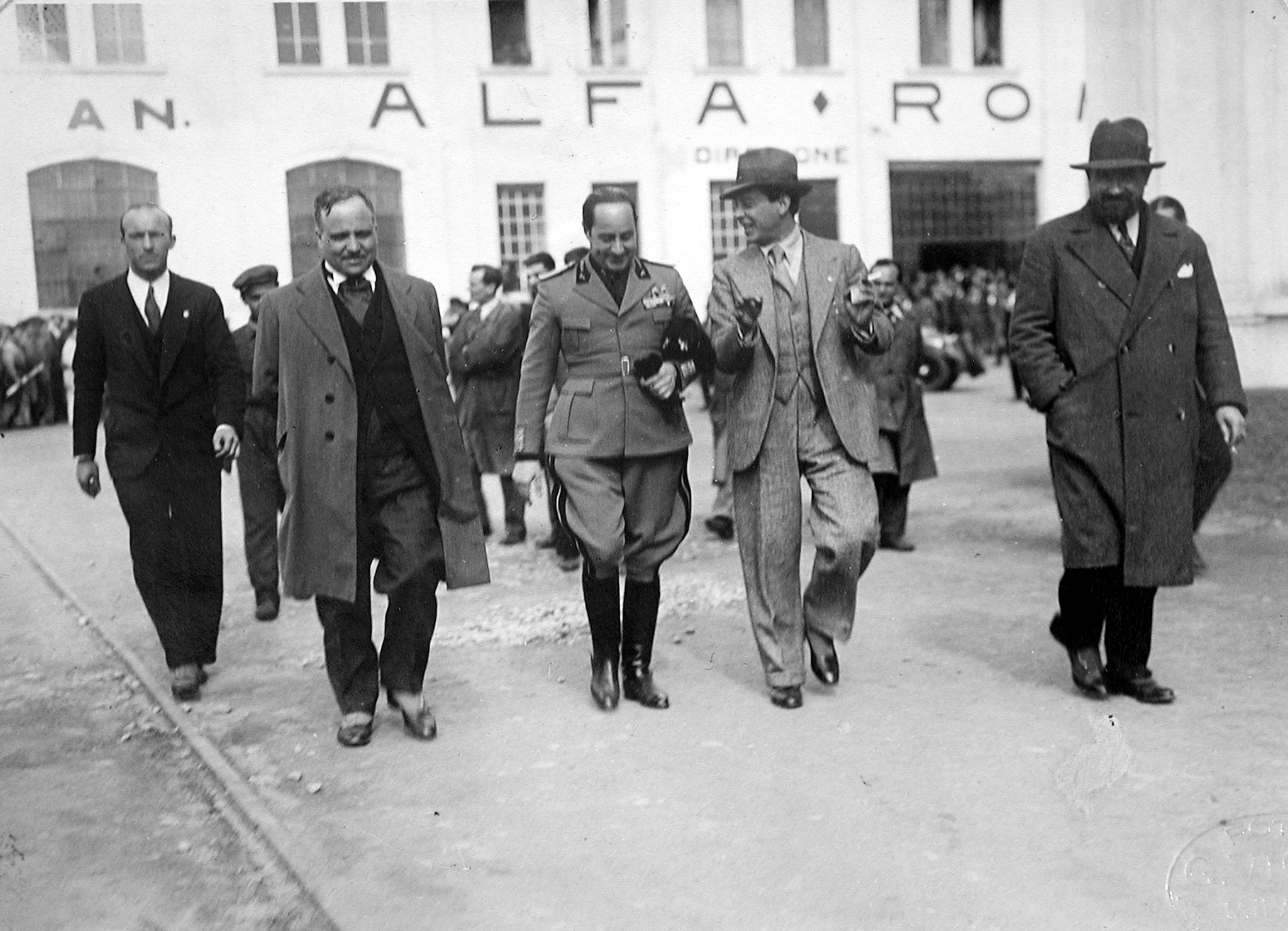
Starace (center) and Italo Balbo (first from right) at the Alfa Romeo factory.

Later in 1922, Starace was appointed party inspector of Sicily and made a member of the Executive Committee of the PNF. In 1923, after resigning as vice-secretary of the party, he was made commander of the National Security Volunteer Militia (Milizia Volontaria per la Sicurezza Nazionale or MVSN) in Trieste. The MVSN was an all-volunteer militia created to organize former Blackshirts.

In 1924, Starace was elected to the Italian Chamber of Deputies and made national party inspector. In 1926, Achille Starace once again became vice-secretary of the PNF, and, in 1928, he was appointed secretary of the Milan branch of the party.

=== Party secretary ===
In 1931, his career reached its peak when he was made party secretary of the PNF. He was appointed to the position primarily for his unquestioning, fanatical loyalty to Mussolini. (Mussolini once remarked that Starace was "a cretin, but an obedient one".) As secretary, Starace staged huge parades and marches, proposed Anti-Semitic racial segregation measures, and greatly expanded Mussolini's cult of personality. He made many public appearances and issued almost daily orders to party members in the form of fogli d'ordine (order sheets), which attracted public mockery and, by the end of his tenure, open criticism from other top Fascists.

Although Starace was successful in increasing party membership, he failed in the later years of his tenure as secretary to reorganize the Italian Fascist Youth Organization (Opera Nazionale Balilla) along the lines of the Hitler Youth (Hitler-Jugend). He also failed to inspire a nationwide enthusiasm for Fascism on par with the popularity that the Nazi Party enjoyed in Germany. Starace served as secretary for a total of eight years. This was longer than any other Secretary had served. But, by the mid-1930s, he had gained numerous enemies in the party hierarchy. Rumors circulated that Starace's family, especially his brothers, had made lucrative illegal deals.

=== Role in the invasion of Ethiopia ===
In 1935, Starace, a colonel, took a leave of absence as PNF Party Secretary to participate in the Italian invasion of Ethiopia and fought on the northern front. In March 1936, after the Battle of Shire, he was given command of a mixed group of Blackshirts and the 3rd Bersaglieri Regiment, which was being assembled in Asmara, Eritrea. Later that month, Starace and his truck-transportable "mechanized column" prepared to advance over rough tracks to seize Gondar, the capital of Begemder Province. Before setting out, "the Panther Man" (L'uomo pantera) gave the following speech to his men:

Soldiers, this is the most risky, most difficult and most important venture of the campaign. Don't waste a shot. We are carrying all the ammunition we are going to have on this trip. This column must be like an electric live wire. Death to the touch! Truck drivers must learn to keep to the right of the road under pain of severe penalties...

Britain is a rich country, Italy is a poor country, but the people of poor countries have hard muscles. The only way to explain the action of the English is that they thought they had only to mass a war fleet in the Mediterranean and Premier Mussolini would take off his hat and bow in submission.

Instead he reared up like a thoroughbred horse and sent his soldiers into Africa. Viva Il Duce!

The roadbuilding skills of Starace's men played an equally important role to their combat prowess. The following morning, April 1, Starace and the column entered Gondar and two days later reached Lake Tana, securing the border region with British Sudan. The East African Fast Column (Colonna Celere dell'Africa Orientale) had covered approximately 120 km in three days.

Starace's brutality during the invasion shocked some of his comrades. Allegedly, he arbitrarily executed prisoners of war, shooting them alternatively in the heart and genitals.

=== Return to party secretary ===
After Ethiopia, Starace resumed his duties as Party Secretary. He continued to be controversial. For example, he decreed that all party flags must be made from an Italian-created textile fabric called "Lanital". Based on casein, a phosphoprotein commonly found in mammalian milk, Lanital was invented in 1935 and, according to Starace, it was a "product of Italian ingenuity." In 1936, Dino Grandi, the Italian Ambassador to Great Britain, appeared in London wearing a suit said to have been made from forty-eight pints of skimmed milk.

During the Munich Crisis in 1938 which ended with Nazi Germany's annexation of the Sudetenland, Starace was a vocal proponent that the French should agree to cede Tunisia to Italy.

=== Starace in Italian sport ===
Starace was a sports fanatic and instituted president of the CONI (Italian National Olympic Committee). He is remembered for such unlikely sports stunts as jumping through a fire circle at the Marmi Stadium in 1938 or horse jumping over a saloon car.

He wanted party officials to look virile and fit and on official ceremonies had them parading at the bersaglieri pace, an Italian variant of goose stepping.

He is specially and more significantly remembered also for a policy of enrollment of the Italian people (either young or not) in Fascist party-linked organizations that bore some semblance to the Scout movement: Opera Nazionale Balilla, Figli della lupa, Avanguardia Giovanile Fascista, Giovane fascista and the labour-related Organizzazione del Dopolavoro (after-work sports).

Sports were of particular importance in Fascist propaganda, heavily exploiting the successes of Italian athletes in international competitions (like boxer Primo Carnera or the Italy national football team), and Starace was quite instrumental in this field, tackling both the mass organisation and the elite side of Italian sports.

=== Dismissal ===
In October 1939, Starace was finally dismissed as party secretary in favour of the popular aviator Ettore Muti. He was made chief of staff of the Blackshirts and he held this position until being dismissed for incompetence in May 1941. He was succeeded by Enzo Galbiati.

== Imprisonment and death ==
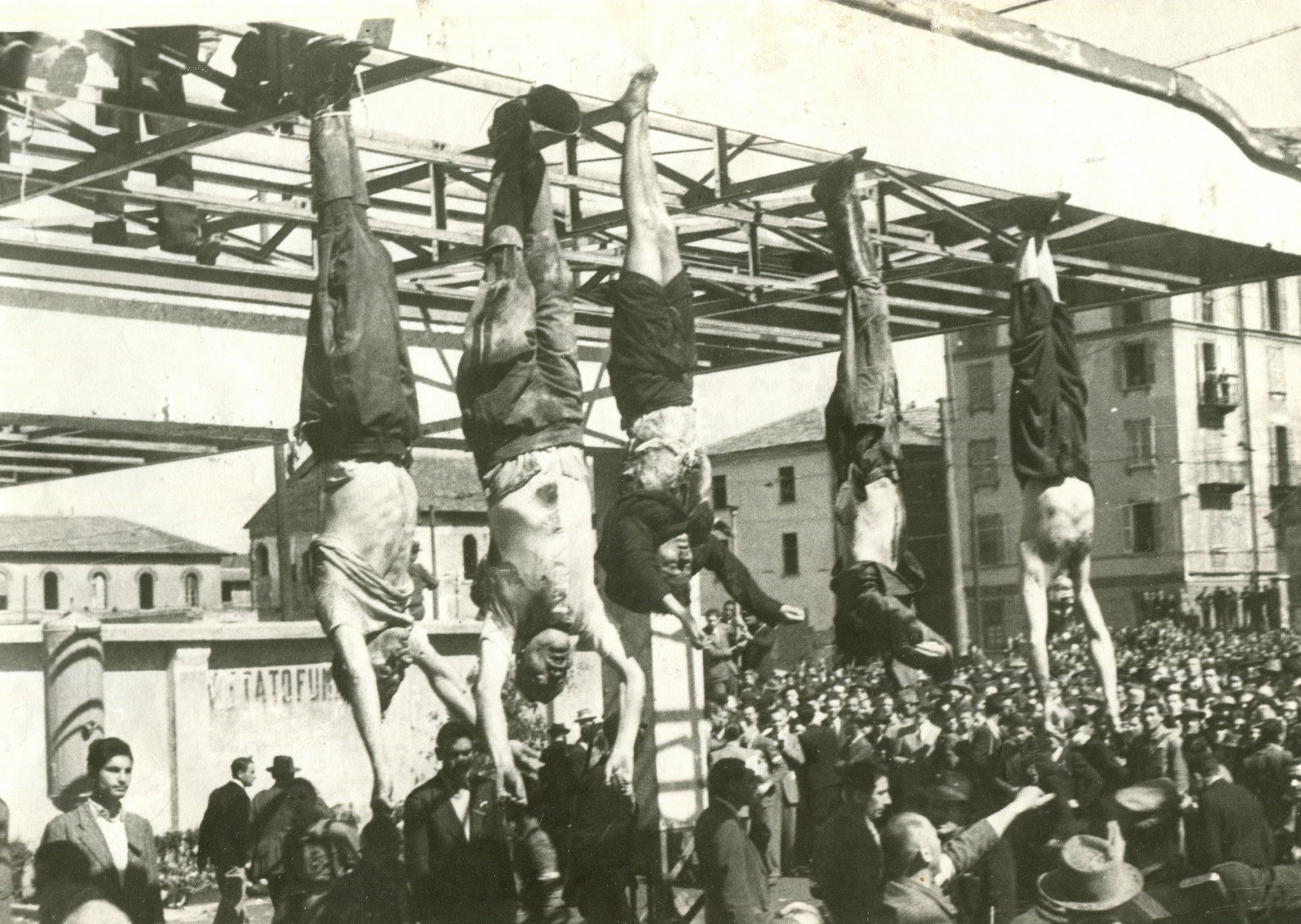
From left to right, the dead bodies of Bombacci, Mussolini, Petacci, Pavolini and Starace in Piazzale Loreto, Milan, 29 April 1945.

In 1943, following the demise of Mussolini's regime, Starace was arrested by Pietro Badoglio's Royalist government. He was arrested even though his real power under Mussolini had ended two years earlier.

After unsuccessfully attempting to regain Mussolini's favour in the German-backed Italian Social Republic of Salò, Starace was again arrested. This time he was arrested by his former colleagues on charges that he had weakened the party during his tenure as Party Secretary, and was imprisoned in a concentration camp in Verona.

Starace was eventually released and moved to Milan. On 29 April 1945, during his morning jog, he was recognized and captured by anti-Fascist Italian partisans. Starace was taken to Piazzale Loreto and shown the body of Mussolini, which he saluted just before he was executed. His body was subsequently strung up alongside Mussolini's.

== Awards and decorations ==
=== Italian ===
- Knight of the Order of Saints Maurice and Lazarus
- Knight of the Military Order of Savoy (17 May 1919)
- Officer of the Military Order of Savoy (24 August 1936)
- Grand Officer of the Order of the Crown of Italy
- Silver Medal of Military Valor
- Bronze Medal of Military Valor (four awards)
- War Merit Cross (award for valor)
- War Merit Cross
- Commemorative Medal for Military Operations in East Africa 1935–1936
- Medal of Merit for the Volunteers of the East African Campaign 1935–1936
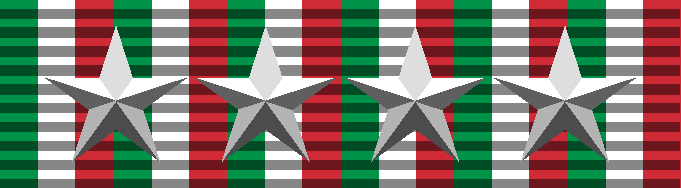
- Commemorative Medal for the Italo-Austrian War 1915–1918 (four years of campaign)
- Commemorative Medal of the Unity of Italy 1848–1918
- Allied Victory Medal 1914-1918
- Commemorative Medal of the March on Rome (Silver) (1923). Awarded to the 19 commanders of the columns that converged on Rome during the March on Rome
- Commemorative Medal of the March on Rome (Gold) (7 December 1931). Awarded on the occasion of Starace's appointment as Secretary of the National Fascist Party
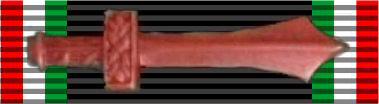
- Cross of Seniority in the Voluntary Militia for National Security (20 years)

=== Foreign ===
- Grand Cross of the Order of the German Eagle (Nazi Germany)

== See also ==
- Italian order of battle for the Second Italo-Ethiopian War

== Sources ==
- Bosworth, R. J. B. (2010) [First edition published in 2002]. Mussolini (New ed.). London: Bloomsbury Academic. ISBN 978-0-34098-173-3.
- Cannistraro, Philip V., ed. (1982). Historical Dictionary of Fascist Italy. Westport, CT: Greenwood Press. ISBN 978-0-313-21317-5.
- Galeotti, Carlo (2000). Achille Starace e il vademecum dello stile fascista. Rubbettino. ISBN 88-7284-904-7.

Party political offices
Preceded by Giovanni Giuriati	Secretary of the National Fascist Party; 12 December 1931 – 31 October 1939	Succeeded by Ettore Muti
Government offices
Preceded by Luigi Russo	Chief of Staff of the Blackshirts; 3 November 1939 – 16 May 1941	Succeeded by Enzo Galbiati
