= Quirino Armellini =

Italian military officer (1889–1975)

General Quirino Armellini
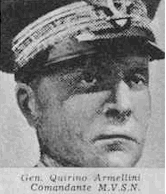
- Armellini depicted as commander of the MVSN.
- Born: 31 January 1889; Legnaro, Province of Padua
- Died: 13 January 1975 (aged 85); Rome
- Military career
- Allegiance: Kingdom of Italy; Italy
- Branch: Royal Italian Army; Italian Army
- Service years: 1908–1952
- Rank: Army corps general
- Commands: 32nd Infantry Division "Marche"; 80th Infantry Division "La Spezia"; XVIII Army Corps; IX Army Corps
- Conflicts: Italo-Turkish War; World War I Second Italo-Ethiopian War; World War II
- Awards: Military Order of Savoy; Order of Merit of the Italian Republic
- Other work: Commander of the Voluntary Militia for National Security (MVSN); Member of the Italian resistance movement

Quirino Armellini (31 January 1889 in Legnaro – 13 January 1975 in Rome) was an Italian military officer, who served as a general in both the Royal Italian Army and the Italian Army.

== Biography ==
Armellini was commissioned into the Royal Italian Army as a second lieutenant in 1908, after graduating from the Military Academy of Modena, and participated in the Italo-Turkish War and the World War I.

After serving under the command of Pietro Badoglio in the Second Italo-Ethiopian War against the Ethiopian Empire, Armellini was appointed commander of the Italian African Police (PAI) in the Italian East Africa (AOI).

From February to August 1942, during the World War II in Yugoslavia, Armellini was appointed commander of the XVIII Army Corps in the Italian-occupied Dalmatia. After that, he was transferred to Southern Italy at the head of the IX Army Corps to defend the South-eastern coast.

After the fall of the Fascist regime in Italy on 25 July 1943, King Victor Emmanuel III appointed Armellini to succeed Benito Mussolini as commander of the Voluntary Militia for National Security (MVSN), the paramilitary wing of the National Fascist Party (PNF). Under his leadership, the MVSN was dissolved and integrated into the regular Royal Army.

From January to March 1944, when Giuseppe Cordero Lanza di Montezemolo was arrested, Armellini assumed the role of head of the Fronte militare clandestino of the Roman Resistance within the Italian resistance movement, later replaced by Roberto Bencivenga.

After World War II, Armellini was president of the Superior Council of the Italian Armed Forces.

== See also ==
- List of senior officers of the Blackshirts

Government offices
Preceded by Benito Mussolini	Commandant–General of the MVSN; 26 July – 8 September 1943	Succeeded by Renato Ricci
