= Rino Parenti =

Italian fascist leader (1895–1953)

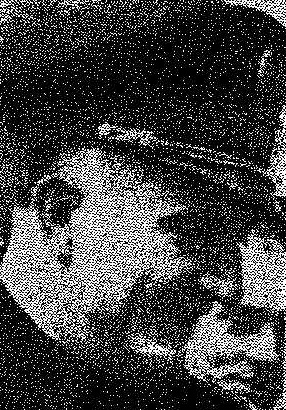
- Rino Parenti in 1928
- Born: 13 July 1895; Milan, Kingdom of Italy
- Died: 19 October 1953 (aged 58); Rome, Italy

Rino Parenti (13 July 1895 – 19 October 1953) was an Italian fascist leader.

== Biography ==
Parenti was born in Milan on 13 July 1895. He was a non-commissioned officer during World War I. He became fascist in 1919 and participated in local squad militant. He was cofounder of the first Fascio di combattimento movement which laid the basis of the Italian Fascist Party. He served at local party and was the federal secretary of the Italian Fascist Party for Milan (federale of Milan) from 26 June 1933 to 1 January 1940. During this period, he succeeded in normalizing Milanese fascism and adapting it to the conditions of the national fascism.

Parenti was the president of the Italian National Olympic Committee from 1939 to 1940. He was the first president elected according to the new rules. In 1939 he became a member of the Chamber of Fasces and Corporations, and from 1 September 1942 to 1 August 1943 he served as prefect of Como. After the armistice of Cassibile he joined the Italian Social Republic, and on 1 October 1943 he was appointed prefect of Sondrio, a post he held until the end of the war, when he was arrested and imprisoned. Parenti died in Rome on 19 October 1953.
