= Ranks and insignia of the National Fascist Party =

Hierachical structure of Italian political party

The ranks and insignia of the National Fascist Party shows the hierarchical structure of ranks and titles bestowed by the PNF.

== Gerarca ==
During the Fascist rule in Italy, a gerarca (Italian: member of a hierarchy, plural: gerarchi) was a higher officer of the National Fascist Party (PNF).

The highest gerarchi, up to the Federal Secretary, were members of the National Council of the PNF and of the Chamber of Fasces and Corporations. The secretary and members of the National Directorate of the PNF were members of the Grand Council of Fascism.

A Ras (from the homonymous Ethiopian title) was a gerarca dominating in one province. So, for example, Italo Balbo was the Ras of Ferrara, and Roberto Farinacci the Ras of Cremona.

== Party Ranks ==
Rank	Rank insignia shoulderboard	Sleeve insignia	Piping	Rank insignia worn on fez	Rank insignia worn on beret (from 1938)
National level
Secretary of the National Fascist Party					
Member of the Grand Council of Fascism, Minister, Secretary of State, Deputy Secretary of the National Fascist Party					
Member of the National Directorate of Fascism					
Party Inspector					
Roles in the Federation of Combat Fasci
Federal Secretary					
Member of the Federal Directorate					
Federal Inspector					
Member of the Federal Disciplinary Commission					-
Roles in the Combat Fasci
Local Organization Leader					
Non-local Organization Leader					
Member of the Local Organization Directorate					
Member of a non-local Organization Directorate					
Local Group Chief					
Member of a local Group Council					
Sector Leader					
Squad Leader					
Member of the local Disciplinary Commission					-
