= Ettore Muti =

Italian politician (1902–1943)

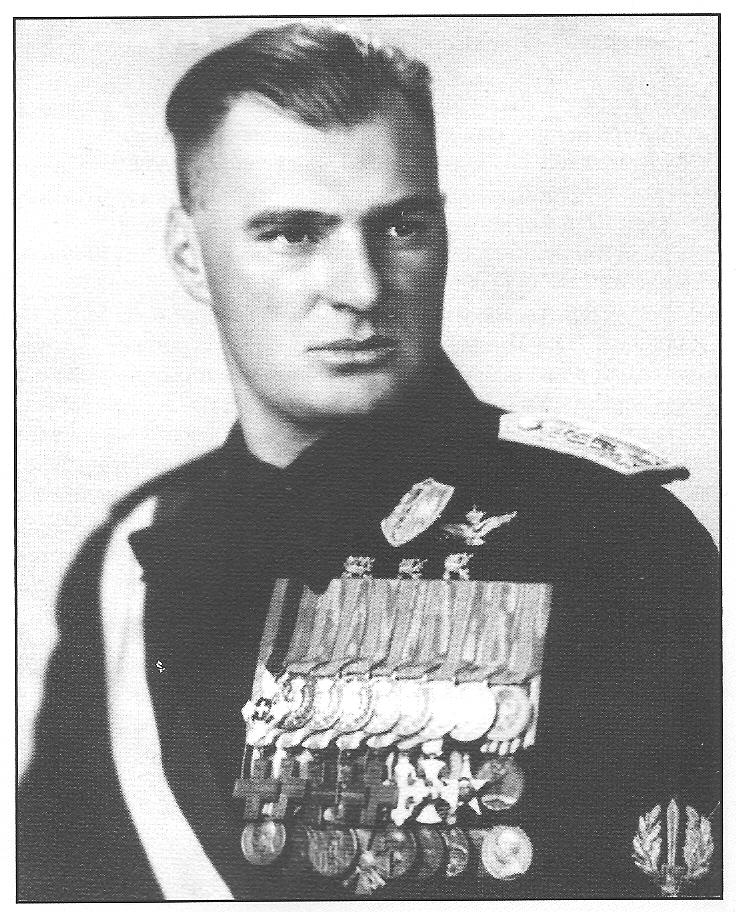

Secretary of the National Fascist Party
- In office 31 October 1939 – 30 October 1940
- Leader: Benito Mussolini
- Preceded by: Achille Starace
- Succeeded by: Adelchi Serena

Personal details
- Born: 22 May 1902 Ravenna, Kingdom of Italy
- Died: 24 August 1943 (aged 41) Rome, Kingdom of Italy
- Party: National Fascist Party
- Height: 1.74 m (5 ft 9 in)

Ettore Muti (22 May 1902 – 24 August 1943) was an Italian aviator and Fascist politician. He was party secretary of the National Fascist Party (Partito Nazionale Fascista, or PNF) from October 1939 until shortly after the entry of Italy into World War II on 10 June 1940.

== World War I and Fiume ==
Born in Ravenna, Romagna, Muti was banned from any school in the country at age 13, after punching one of his teachers. The next year, he ran away from home in order to fight in World War I, but was recovered and returned by the Carabinieri. At 15, a new attempt was successful, and Muti joined the famed Arditi.

On the front, Muti distinguished himself through feats of audacity. His detachment of 800 men was ordered to establish a bridgehead under enemy fire: it managed to do so, but was only left with 23 members at the end of the day. Gabriele D'Annunzio benefited from Muti's services during his seizing of Fiume (now Rijeka, Croatia) in September 1919–January 1921; he gave Muti the lasting moniker Gim dagli occhi verdi ("Green-Eyed Jim"). In fact, Muti was rarely involved in fighting over Fiume, being more likely to engage in flamboyant stunts. D'Annunzio told Muti: "You are the expression of Superhuman values, a weightless impetus, a boundless offering, a fistful of incense over the embers, the scent of a pure soul".

== Between the world wars ==
During this time, Muti met Benito Mussolini, for whom he developed a lasting fascination. A Fascist as soon as the Fiume episode came to an end, he was arrested on several occasions. On 29 October 1922, he was head of the squad that occupied Ravenna City Hall during the March on Rome. After the taking over of the state, Ettore Muti made a career in the Blackshirts, organized as the "Voluntary State Security Militia" (Milizia Volontaria per la Sicurezza Nazionale, MVSN).

His life remained adventurous: a womanizer and entertaining host, Muti cruised in speeding cars or on his Harley Davidson. In 1926 he married Fernanda Mazzotti, the daughter of a banker, and, in 1929, fathered his only child Diana. He escaped an assassination attempt carried out by a left-wing activist on 13 September 1927, but was shot twice in his abdomen and arm, as a result. His survival was uncertain for a period of time, and he was left with a 20 cm scar.

He joined the Regia Aeronautica (Italian air force), developing a passion for aircraft – he accepted demotion to lieutenant, according to the practical requirements of the service. He flew during the Second Italo-Abyssinian War in 1935–1936, where his skills as a pilot earned him a Silver Medal of Military Valor.

In 1936 he returned to Italy, but left soon after as a volunteer on Francisco Franco's side in the Spanish Civil War, fighting under the pseudonym Gim Valeri. He led a squadron of bombers over Republican ports, winning several silver medals, and, in 1938, a Gold Medal of Military Valor. He returned with the new moniker Cid alato ("The Winged El Cid") and the prestigious Military Order of Savoy. Later in 1938, he left for Italian-influenced Albania, staying on through its full occupation by the Italians in 1939 (and winning another medal).

== In World War II ==
Upon his return, Muti was awarded the PNF party secretary position replacing Achille Starace. He was awarded this position based on the intervention of his friend Galeazzo Ciano. However, Muti disliked this inactive duty, and profited from the outbreak of the war to return in the military. As a lieutenant colonel, Muti participated during the Italian invasion of France, during the long-range bombing of Haifa and Bahrain, and during the Battle of Britain. However, his hasty departure from his party secretary position made him lose the friendship of both Ciano and Mussolini.

In 1943, Muti joined the military intelligence service. On 25 July, the day of the pro-Allied coup d'état in the Grand Council of Fascism, Muti was in Spain, trying to obtain the radar set of a United States aircraft that had crashed on neutral territory. He returned to Rome on 27 July, and remained in his private villa. On the night of 23–24 August, a group of Carabinieri entered his residence and placed him under arrest. They all left through a pine forest surrounding the area, and the following moments are still mysterious. The official communiqué stated:

Following an investigation into major irregularities in the administration of a state-associated entity, during which the implication of the ex-secretary of the dissolved fascist party, Ettore Muti, has become apparent, the Carabinieri military corps proceeded in Muti's arrest at Fregene, near Fiumicino (then part of the comune of Rome), on the night of 23–24 August. As they led him to their barracks, the escort was shot at with several rounds from the forest. In the momentary disturbance, he attempted to run away, but, after being shot at and wounded by the Carabinieri, he died.

The major irregularities mentioned were never clarified, nor were the identities of shooters in the forest. In the dramatic gunfight, Muti was the only one hit: his cap displayed two holes, one in the back of the head, the other in front. Other circumstances point as well towards a political execution, with Ettore Muti as the first victim in the violence that engulfed Italy for the next two years. Pietro Badoglio, the leader who had deposed Mussolini, defined Muti as "a menace" in a letter he had previously sent to the head of the local police: it is likely that Muti was informed about the role of Badoglio in the catastrophic Italian defeat of Caporetto, a role that Badoglio in the years after World War I had tried to hide.

After his death, Muti became the main hero of Italian Fascist regime (revived in northern Italy with help from Nazi Germany, as the Italian Social Republic). His name was given to an autonomous Police Legion stationed in Milan and to one of the most feared Black Brigades units.

Party political offices
| Preceded by Achille Starace | Secretary of the National Fascist Party; 31 October 1939 – 30 October 1940 | Succeeded by Adelchi Serena |
