= Duce =

Italian title

Head of Government, Leader of Fascism and Founder of the Empire
- Capo del Governo, Duce del Fascismo e Fondatore dell'Impero
- Standard of the Duce

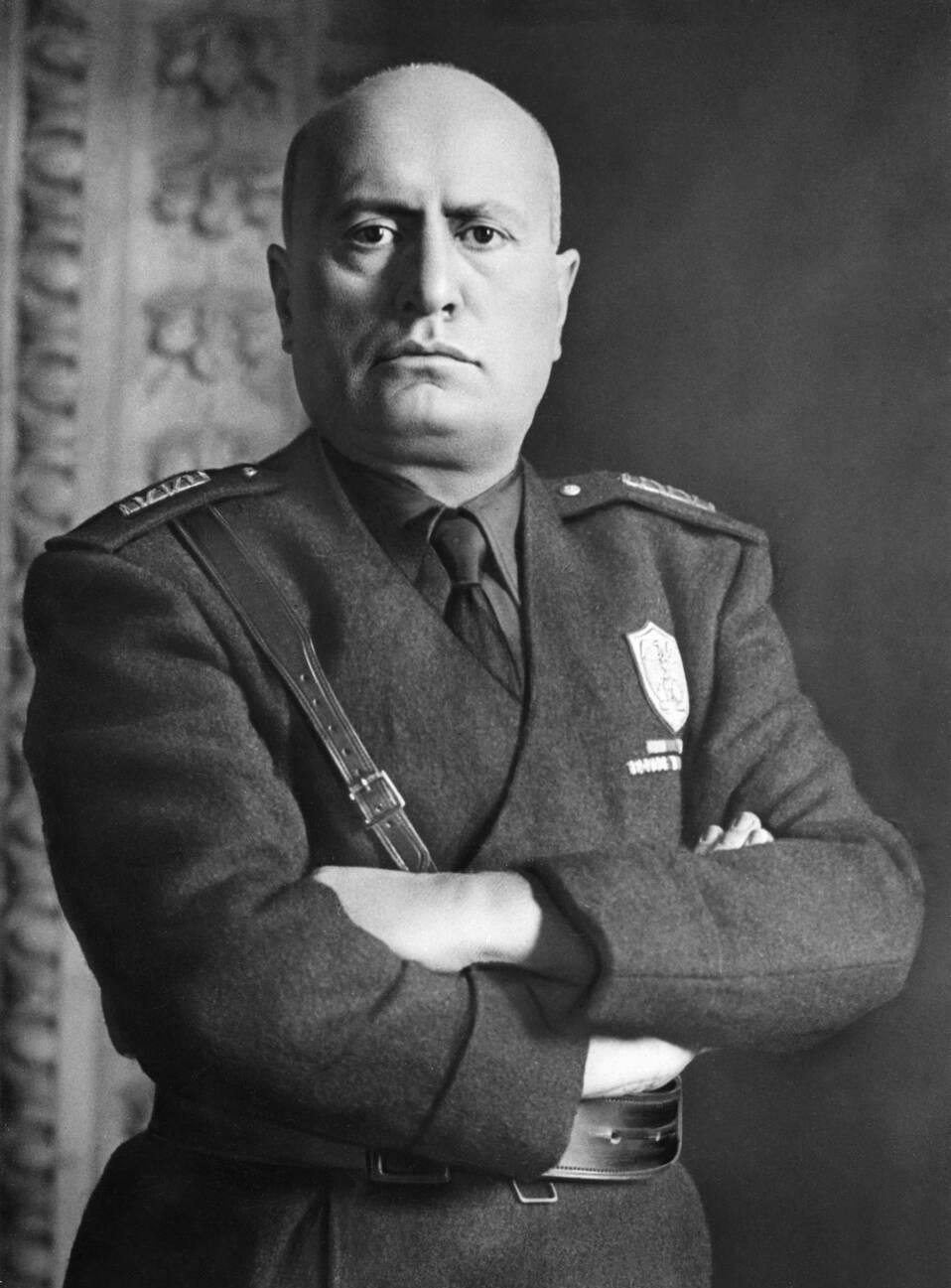
- Benito Mussolini; 23 March 1919 – 28 April 1945
- Residence: Palazzo Chigi (1925–1929); Palazzo Venezia (1929–1943); Villa Torlonia (1925–1943)
- Appointer: Grand Council of Fascism
- Precursor: Prime Minister
- Formation: 23 March 1919
- First holder: Benito Mussolini
- Final holder: Benito Mussolini
- Abolished: 28 April 1945

Duce (/ˈduːtʃeɪ/ DOO-chay, Italian: [ˈduːtʃe]) is an Italian title, derived from the Latin word dux, 'leader', and a cognate of duke. National Fascist Party leader Benito Mussolini was identified by Fascists as Il Duce ('The Leader') of the movement since the birth of the Fasci Italiani di Combattimento in 1919. In 1925 it became a reference to the dictatorial position of Sua Eccellenza Benito Mussolini, Capo del Governo, Duce del Fascismo e Fondatore dell'Impero ('His Excellency Benito Mussolini, Head of Government, Leader of Fascism and Founder of the Empire'). Mussolini held this title together with that of President of the Council of Ministers: this was the constitutional position which entitled him to rule Italy on behalf of the king of Italy. Founder of the Empire was added for the exclusive use by Mussolini in recognition of his founding of an official legal entity of the Italian Empire on behalf of the king in 1936 following Italy's victory in the Second Italo-Ethiopian War. The position was held by Mussolini until 1943, when he was removed from office by the king and the position of Duce was discontinued, while Marshal Pietro Badoglio was appointed Presidente del Consiglio.

This position was the model which other fascist leaders adopted, such as the position of Führer by Adolf Hitler and Caudillo by Francisco Franco. In September 1943, Mussolini styled himself as the "Duce of the Italian Social Republic" (Italian: Duce della Repubblica Sociale Italiana), and held the position until the collapse of the Italian Social Republic and his execution in April 1945.

== History of the term ==
The title was used outside its traditional noble sense in some of the publications praising Giuseppe Garibaldi during the Italian unification in 1860, although not taken up officially by Garibaldi himself.

Duce Supremo (lit. 'Supreme Leader') was more formally used by Victor Emmanuel III in 1915, during World War I, referring to his role as the commander in chief of the armed forces. The term was also used by Gabriele d'Annunzio as dictator of the self-proclaimed Italian Regency of Carnaro in 1920, and most significantly by Italian fascist dictator Benito Mussolini. The first record of the term being used in reference to Mussolini dates to a banquet held in his honor in Forlì in 1912, celebrating his new position as editor-in-chief of Avanti!.

Because the title Il Duce has become associated with fascism, it is no longer in common use other than in reference to Mussolini. Because of modern anti-fascist sentiment, Italian speakers in general now use other words for leader, mainly including the English loanword. Duce survives as an antonomasia for Mussolini.

== Succession ==
Mussolini intended that the Grand Council of Fascism would choose a successor from a list of three men chosen by him, and submit the name for approval by the king. As of 1940, he may have been preparing his son-in-law Galeazzo Ciano for the role.

== Title holder ==
Portrait	Duce (born–died)	Took office	Left office	Tenure	Affiliation
	Benito Mussolini (1883–1945)	23 March 1919	9 November 1921	26 years, 33 days	Italian Fasces of Combat
	Benito Mussolini (1883–1945)	9 November 1921	25 July 1943	26 years, 33 days	National Fascist Party
	Benito Mussolini (1883–1945)	23 September 1943	28 April 1945 †	26 years, 33 days	Republican Fascist Party

== See also ==
- The dictionary definition of duce at Wiktionary
- Caudillo
- Conducător
- Doge
- Führer
- Poglavnik
- Supreme Leader (disambiguation)
