= Francesco Colombo (soldier) =

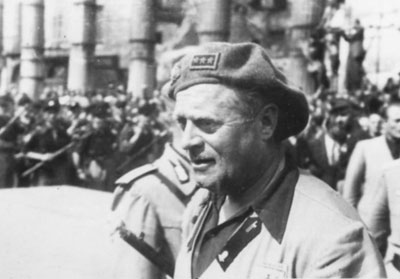
- Born: 26 July 1889; Milan, Kingdom of Italy
- Died: 28 April 1945 (aged 55); Lenno, Italy
- Military career
- Allegiance: Kingdom of Italy; Italian Social Republic
- Branch: Royal Italian Army; MVSN; Republican Police Corps
- Rank: Colonel
- Commands: Autonomous Mobile Legion "Ettore Muti"
- Conflicts: World War I; World War II; Italian Civil War

Francesco Colombo (26 July 1889 – 28 April 1945) was an Italian Fascist soldier and policeman, founder and leader of the Legione Autonoma Mobile "Ettore Muti" ("Autonomous Mobile Legion Ettore Muti"), an anti-partisan unit of the Italian Social Republic infamous for its atrocities.

== Biography ==
Colombo was born in Milan and enlisted in the Royal Italian Army in the final year of the First World War, serving as an airman and reaching the rank of sergeant. After the war he became one of the first squadristi, and after the establishment of the Fascist regime he was appointed regent of the "Montegani" Fascist Group, named after an aviator killed in action during the First World War. In 1926 this group was subjected to an administrative investigation carried out by lawyer Alessandro Garavaglia, who accused Colombo of embezzlement; on 19 September 1926 Garavaglia met with Colombo and Giuseppe Carbone, a member of his fascist group, but after a heated quarrel he was shot dead by a drunken Carbone. Both Colombo and Carbone tried to flee, but they were recognized by a witness, arrested and imprisoned in San Vittore. They were charged with murder, but on 16 March 1927 Colombo was acquitted of all charges after Carbone assumed all responsibility. Nevertheless, on 9 April 1927 he was expelled from the National Fascist Party. Having thus been forced to leave politics, he lived on expedients and small businesses. In 1938 he went bankrupt and in 1939 he was sentenced to six months in prison in for bankruptcy fraud; in 1940 he was again sentenced for breaching family support obligations.

Colombo rose again to prominence after the Armistice of Cassibile and the establishment of the Italian Social Republic, in September 1943; he gathered all Fascist diehards in Milan under his banner and established the "Ettore Muti Action Squad", of which he assumed command. Colombo represented the "extremist" faction of the Milanese Fascists, opposed to the "moderate" faction led by local PFR secretary Aldo Resega; his "Muti", whose primary task was repressing anti-fascism, soon became infamous for its excesses and atrocities, and from recruiting many of its men from common criminals released from the San Vittore prison, a fact for which Resega reprimanded Colombo to no avail. The federale of Milan in fact planned to disband Colombo's unit, arresting its most compromised members and transferring the remainder to the Republican National Guard, but before he could act he was assassinated by the GAP on 17 December 1943. Resega's death resulted in Colombo's extremist faction prevailing over the moderates; he appointed one of his men, Dante Boattini, as the new federale of Milan, having him cancel all the plans for the dissolution of the "Muti", and even replaced the local police chief.

Despite the arrest of Colombo's deputy, Arrigo Alemagna, on 18 January 1944, on the orders of Benito Mussolini, on 18 March of the same year the "Ettore Muti Action Squad" was enlarged and officially reorganized as "Ettore Muti Autonomous Mobile Legion", and Colombo was officially appointed questore by the Minister of the Interior Guido Buffarini Guidi, while simultaneously assuming the rank of colonel. In the same days, Colombo violently quarrelled with Vincenzo Costa, a follower of Resega, who had been appointed federale of Milan in place of Boattini.

On 19 March 1944 Colombo was dispatched to Piedmont with part of his men (two battalions and one special company) to carry out anti-partisan operations in the Cuneo area; he returned to Milan on March 27, leaving the command of military operations to his deputy, Lieutenant Colonel Ampelio Spadoni. From late May 1944, some companies of the "Muti" were also deployed in the Vercelli area. On 7 June Colombo was slightly wounded during an ambush near Brossasco during an inspection round in the Cuneo area, and on 14 August, assuming direct command of the "Baragiotta-Salines" Special Company, he participated in a roundup in Varzi, in the province of Pavia. In the same days, "Muti" soldiers formed the firing squad that shot fifteen captured partisans in Piazzale Loreto in reprisal for the partisan bombing of a German truck, in which six civilians had been killed.

In the autumn of 1944 the situation in Milan was exacerbated by the arrival of Pietro Koch's "Special Department of Republican Police", better known as Banda Koch, previously based in Rome; a unit whose sinister reputation ever surpassed that of the "Muti". Minister Guido Buffarini Guidi tried to remove them from Milan, but his attempt failed due to Pietro Koch's refusal to leave the city. On 25 September 1944, therefore, a company of the Muti Legion under the command of Major Luciano Folli, on the orders of the Milan police chief and following the direct intervention of Mussolini, arrested the members of the Banda Koch and imprisoned them in San Vittore. After this Koch, who had temporarily escaped arrest, accused Colombo of being "a puppet in the hands of [Enrico] Varenna", an industrialist and financial backer of Roberto Farinacci as well as a close friend of Raffaello Riccardi, former Minister of Finance, and of Piero Parini, prefect of Milan.

In the final days of the Italian Social Republic, Colombo suggested to Mussolini to retreat to the Valtellina Redoubt rather than towards Germany. After waiting in vain for the units coming from Piedmont, Colombo left Milan for Como on 26 April 1945, with two hundreds of his men, reuniting with Alessandro Pavolini. Having lost contact with Mussolini, who in the meantime had left for Menaggio, Colombo's column made a deal with the National Liberation Committee to obtain free transit, but on the morning of April 27 the partisans blocked the road near Cernobbio, demanding its surrender. The "Muti" was therefore dissolved by Colombo, who then joined former PFR deputy secretary Pino Romualdi and Vanni Teodorani, former head of Mussolini's military secretariat, in an attempt to reach Mussolini in Menaggio and convince him to surrender himself to the Allies. The trio was accompanied by Giovanni Dessy, a former naval officer now working as a secret agent for the Allies, carrying a safe conduct; in Cadenabbia, however, their car ran into a partisan checkpoint, where Colombo was recognized. Although Dessy showed the partisans his mission orders, all occupants of the car were arrested and taken to San Fedele Intelvi; here Dessy managed to have Romualdi released, as he had not been recognized, but Colombo was detained for two days and then taken to Lenno, where he was executed by firing squad on 28 April 1945. He was buried in the Cimitero Maggiore of Milan.
