= Igino Ghisellini =

Italian politician (1895–1943)

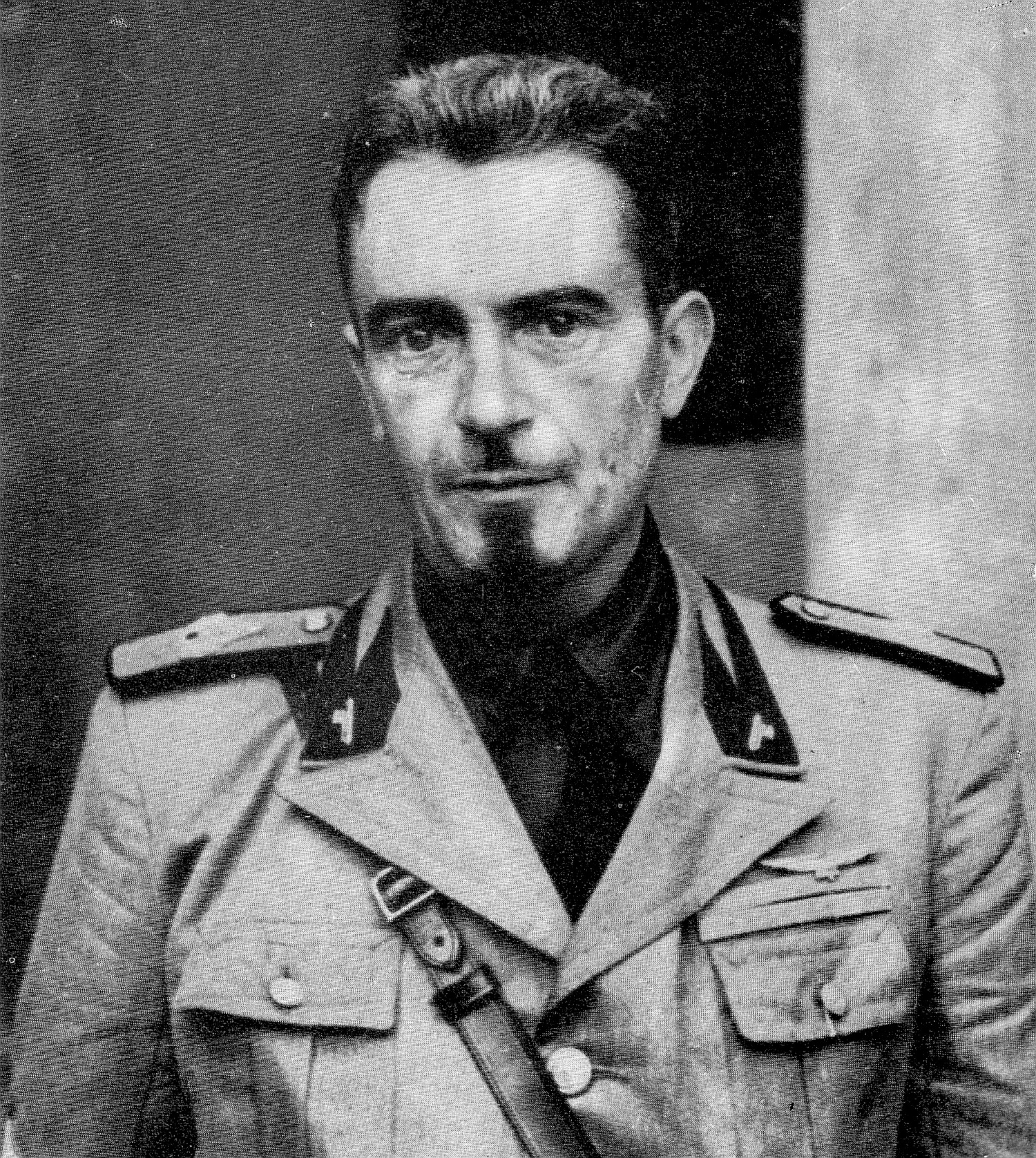

Federal Secretary of the Republican Fascist Party of Ferrara
- In office 21 September 1943 – 13 November 1943

Personal details
- Born: 20 July 1895 Cento, Kingdom of Italy
- Died: 13 November 1943 (aged 48) Ferrara, Italian Social Republic
- Party: National Fascist Party; Republican Fascist Party

Military service
- Allegiance: Kingdom of Italy; Italian Social Republic
- Branch/service: Royal Italian Army; MVSN
- Rank: Major
- Battles/wars: World War I; Battles of the Isonzo; Second Battle of Monte Grappa; Battle of Vittorio Veneto; Vlora War; Second Italo-Ethiopian War; Spanish Civil War; World War II; Yugoslav front
- Awards: Silver Medal of Military Valor (three times); Bronze Medal of Military Valor (three times)

Igino Ghisellini (20 July 1895 – 13 November 1943) was an Italian Fascist politician and soldier.

== Biography ==
Ghisellini was born on 20 July 1895 in Buonacompra, a hamlet in the municipality of Cento, the son of Napoleone Ghisellini. He enlisted as a volunteer in the First World War and in 1916 he became an Arditi officer, being wounded on 6 October of the same year. Having recovered from his injuries, he fought on Dosso Faiti in March 1917, on Monte Solarolo in June 1918 (during the Second Battle of Monte Grappa, being awarded a Silver Medal of Military Valor) and in September 1918 in Val dei Pez, where he earned another Silver Medal. He was wounded again and returned to Cento on leave, but soon decided to leave the hospital where he had been convalescing to return to service; he participated in the battle of Vittorio Veneto in the XVIII Assault Unit, fighting on Col della Martina from 26 October 1918 and being wounded on Mount Pertica the next day. For this action he was awarded his third Silver Medal of Military Valor.

In 1919 he was sent to Albania, and after returning to Italy he joined the National Fascist Party (PNF) from 1921, together with his younger brothers Massimiliano and Bruno, taking part in the March on Rome the following year. This adhesion to the PNF from the beginning guaranteed him recognition as squadrista. He graduated in veterinary medicine at the University of Bologna, and was elected town councilor in Cento from December 17, 1922.

In 1929 he obtained a second degree in pharmacy and chemistry, as well as becoming secretary of the PNF in the Casumaro district of Cento, where he lived and worked as a veterinarian. In 1936 he volunteered for the Second Italo-Ethiopian War, where he was awarded two Bronze Medals of Military Valor (in November 1936 and March 1937), returning briefly to his homeland in 1937 and then departing again in 1938 to take part in the Spanish Civil War alongside the nationalists as part of Italy's Corpo Truppe Volontarie.

In July 1941 Ghisellini joined the federal directorate of the National Fascist Party of Ferrara. With the rank of seniore (Major) of the Voluntary Militia for National Security (MVSN), Ghisellini took part in the Second World War on the Yugoslav front, in the ranks of the LXXV Blackshirt Assault Battalion "Ferrara", and subsequently in counter-guerrilla operations, fighting alongside the Ustaše in Croatia. In these clashes he lost a relative, Costantino Ghisellini, killed in an ambush in 1942; in the same year he was awarded a Bronze Medal of Military Valor for an action near Križpolje on 13 August. He returned to Italy in the summer of 1943.

The day after the Armistice of Cassibile, 9 September 1943, Ferrara was occupied by German troops. Subsequently, the prefect and the local Fascist leaders agreed to reopen the local section of the National Fascist Party, with the aim of promoting the newly established Italian Social Republic. Igino Ghisellini was proposed by Alessandro Pavolini as a federal secretary of the Republican Fascist Party of Ferrara, which would arise from the former PNF. Ghisellini officially assumed office on 21 September 1943, while also taking command of the reconstituted 75th MVSN Legion "Italo Balbo". He used to travel the stretch of road between Ferrara and Casumaro on a daily basis in the Fiat 1100 made available to him by the PFR federation. Along this stretch of road, he was killed with six gunshots around 9 pm on November 13, 1943. His body was then left in Castello d'Argile, where he was found the next morning in a ditch along the road. Most sources credit the assassination to the Gruppi di Azione Patriottica, but some historians have suggested instead that Ghisellini was murdered by enemies among his own Fascist comrades.

To avenge his death, a punitive team was organized by Pavolini himself, led by prefect Enrico Vezzalini, Blackshirt colonel Giovanni Battista Riggio and PFR delegate for Emilia-Romagna Franz Pagliani, which reached Ferrara in the afternoon of 14 November. That same evening 74 citizens of Ferrara were arrested and eleven people, Jews and anti-Fascists, were chosen among them and shot at dawn at the Castello Estense on November 15, in what became known as the Ferrara massacre, depicted in the Florestano Vancini film Long Night in 1943. Even Mussolini described the reprisal as "stupid and bestial". The Black Brigade of Ferrara was named after Ghisellini.
