= Eugenio Facchini =

Italian politician (1912–1944)

Federal Secretary of the Republican Fascist Party of Bologna
- In office October 1943 – 26 January 1944
- Preceded by: office established
- Succeeded by: Pietro Torri

Personal details
- Born: 21 April 1912 Conselice, Kingdom of Italy
- Died: 26 January 1944 (aged 31) Bologna, Italian Social Republic
- Party: National Fascist Party; Republican Fascist Party

Military service
- Allegiance: Kingdom of Italy; Italian Social Republic
- Battles/wars: World War II; Italian campaign on the Eastern Front

Eugenio Facchini (21 April 1912 – 26 January 1944) was an Italian politician and soldier.

== Biography ==
He was born in Conselice on 21 April 1912, to Pietro Facchini and Maria Gualdrini. He graduated from the Faculty of Law of the University of Bologna in 1936; during his years of study he was secretary of the Fascist University Group (G.U.F.) of Bologna. In 1941, he started writing for Architrave, a monthly magazine of politics, literature and art published by the G.U.F. of Bologna. He later enlisted as a volunteer on the Eastern Front "to be forgiven for an article in Architrave against the excessive power of the leaders of the Fascist Party", and after returning to Italy he was appointed director of the magazine. In June 1942, Facchini also assumed the office of secretary of the GUF of Bologna, and in 1943, that of inspector of the GUF for Northern Italy.

Architrave ceased its publications following the Fall of Fascism in July 1943, and after the Armistice of Cassibile in September Facchini decided to join the Italian Social Republic. In October 1943, he was appointed by Alessandro Pavolini, with the approval of Mussolini himself, as Federal Secretary of the Republican Fascist Party of Bologna. On 26 January 1944 he was ambushed and shot dead in Bologna by GAP members Remigio Venturoli, Ermanno Galeotti and Bruno Pasquali. In reprisal for his assassination, eight political prisoners were sentenced to death and executed on the following day. The 23rd Black Brigade, headquartered in Bologna, was named after him.
