= Valtellina Redoubt =

World War II proposed fascist last stand in the Alps

The Valtellina

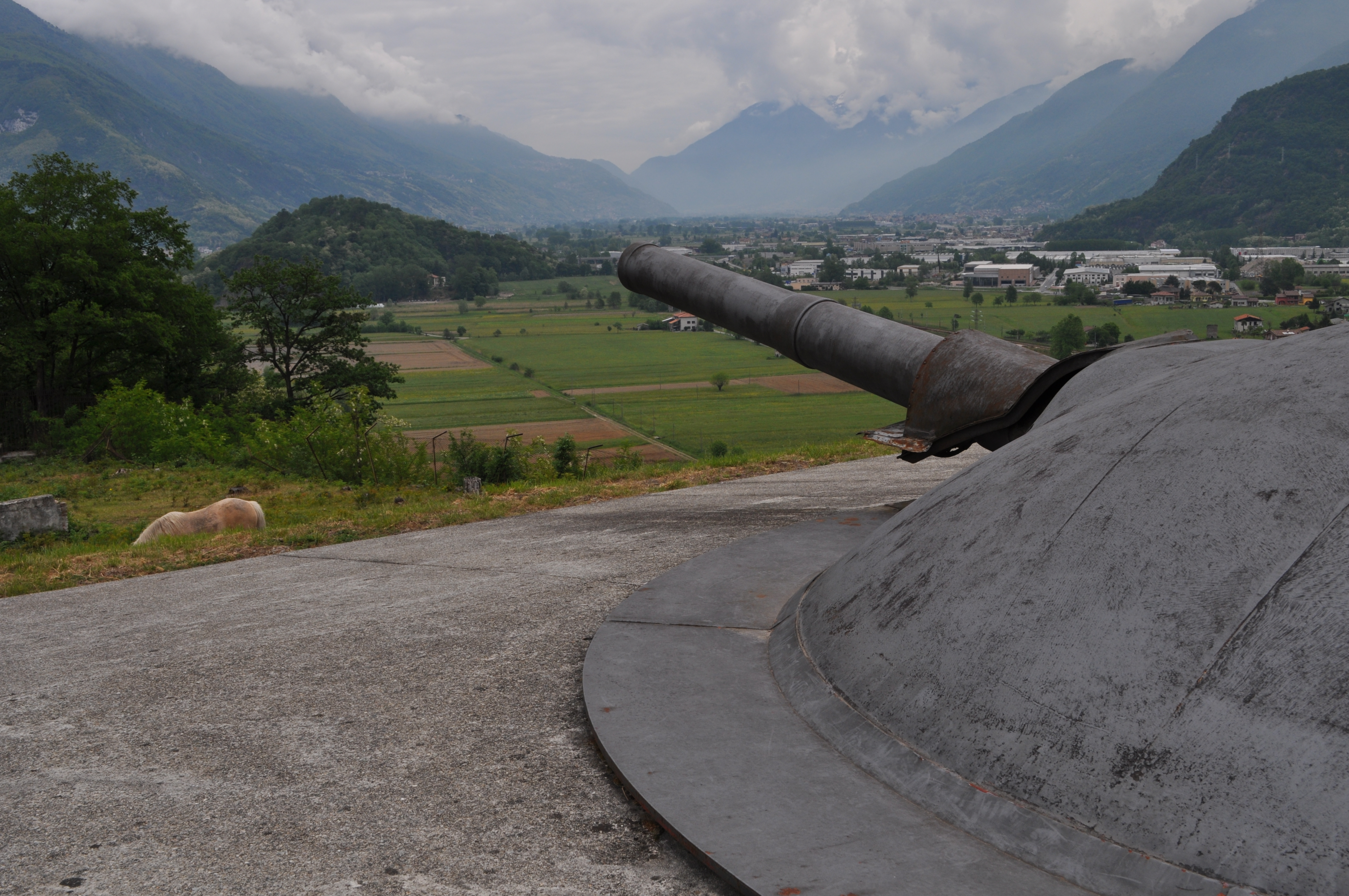
Western entrance of the Valtellina, overlooked by WWI Fort Montecchio

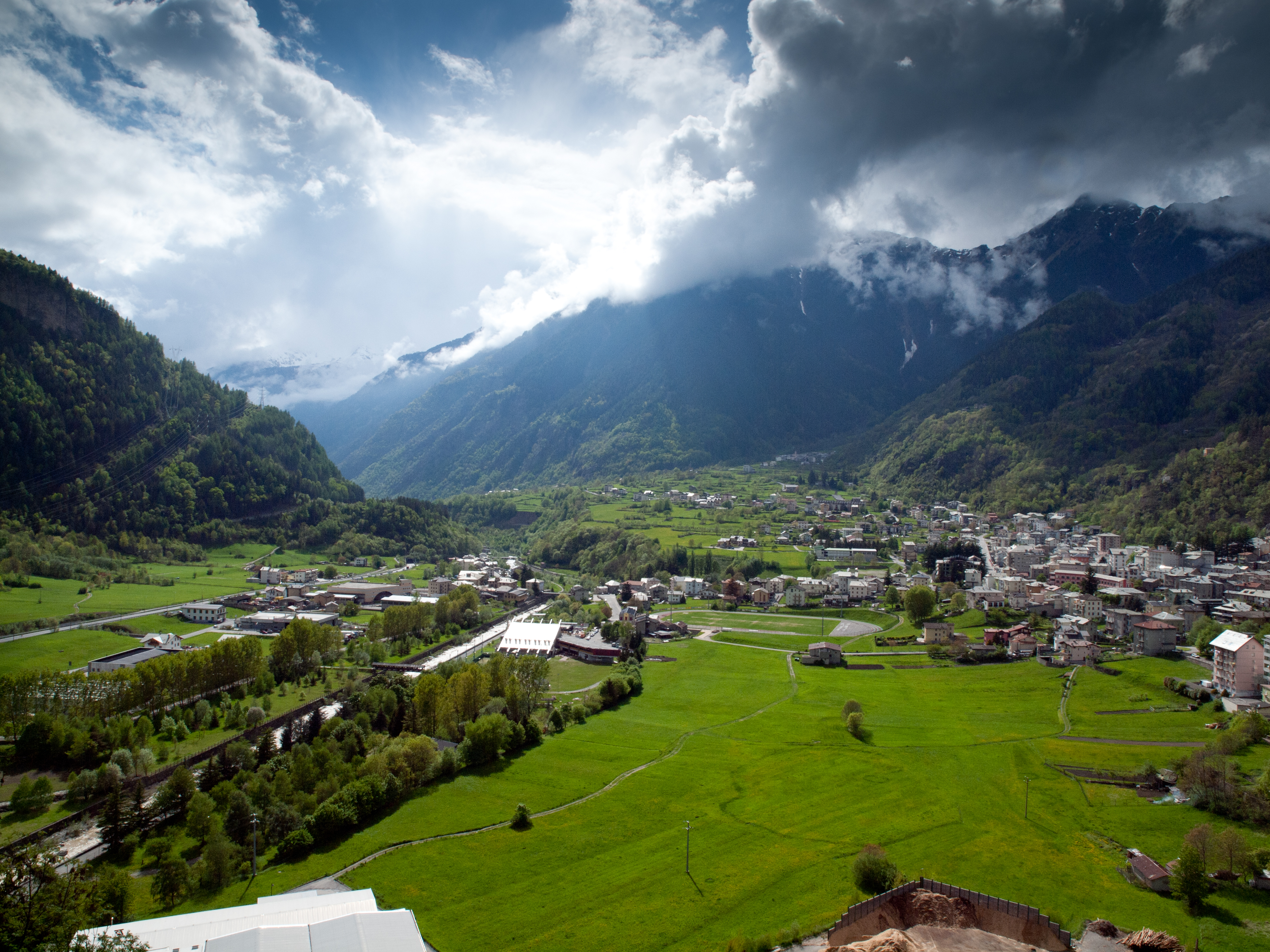
The upper Valtellina at Sondalo, bending northwards

The Valtellina Redoubt or, officially, in Italian: Ridotto Alpino Repubblicano (transl. Republican Alpine Redoubt) or RAR, was the intended final stronghold or redoubt of the Italian fascist regime of Benito Mussolini at the end of World War II in Europe. It was to be based in the Valtellina, a valley in the Italian Alps, which had the natural protection afforded by the surrounding mountains as well as the possibility of re-using fortifications built in the area for World War I. The idea was initially proposed in September 1944 by Alessandro Pavolini, one of the fascist leaders, who saw it as the place for the regime to make a "heroic" last stand which would inspire a future fascist revolution.

Although Pavolini's idea was supported by Mussolini, the fascist leadership as a whole was divided over it. Only minimal preparatory work was carried out to establish the area as a stronghold and, as a result, when the Allied victory in Italy approached in April 1945, the Valtellina was not ready to be used by the fascists as a redoubt. At the end of April, resistance to the Allied advance quickly collapsed without any major "last stand", and the war in Italy soon ended with the Axis forces signing the Surrender of Caserta on 29 April 1945.

== Background ==
With the fall of the Fascist regime in Italy in July 1943 following the Allied invasion of Sicily, Mussolini was deposed as dictator and placed under arrest. In September of that year, the Allies launched the invasion of mainland Italy from the south. In the same month, German special forces rescued Mussolini in the Gran Sasso raid and Hitler installed him as leader of the Italian Social Republic, a German puppet state in the Axis-controlled northern half of the country, and based at the town of Salò near Lake Garda. By 1944, the "Salò Republic", as it came to be called, was threatened not only by the Allies advancing from the south but also internally by Italian anti-fascist partisans, in a brutal conflict that was to become known as the Italian Civil War.

Slowly fighting their way up the Italian Peninsula, the Allies took Rome and then Florence in the summer of 1944 and later that year they began advancing into northern Italy. With the final collapse of the German army's Gothic Line in April 1945, total defeat for the Salò Republic and its German protectors was imminent.

== Pavolini's proposal ==
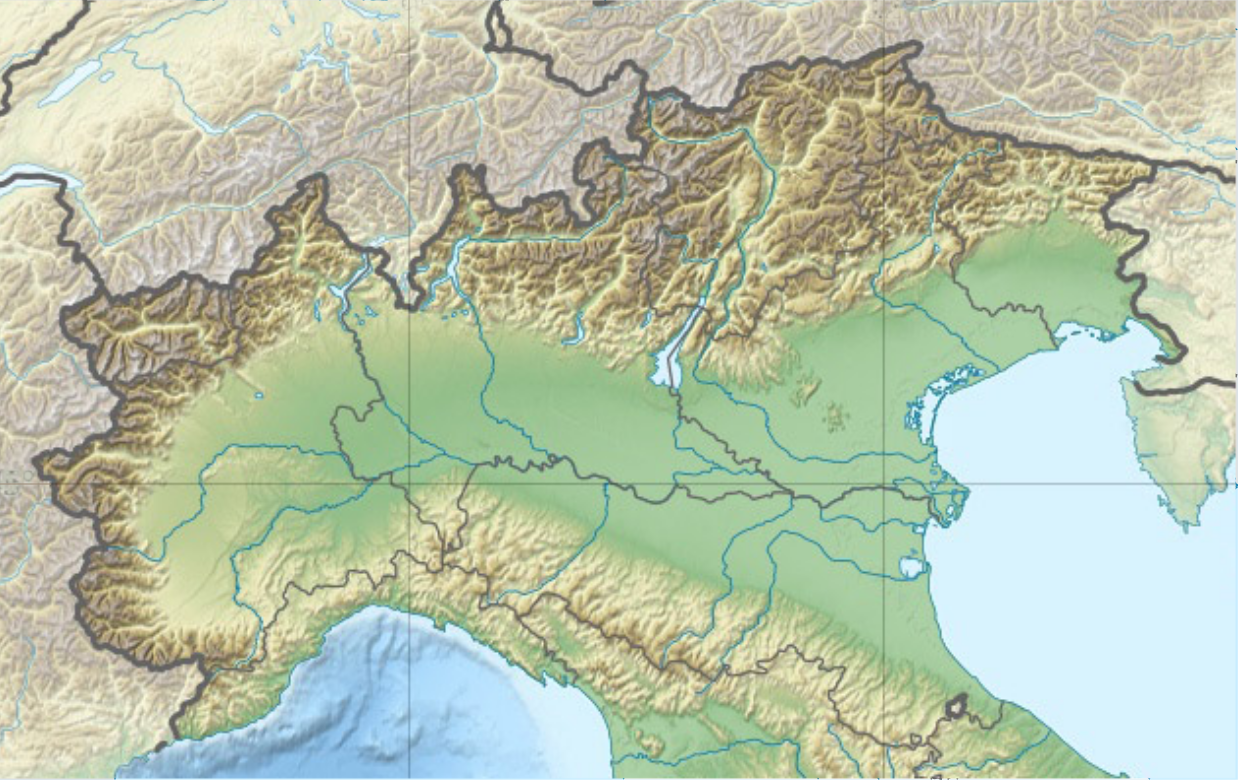

Northern Italy: location of Valtellina (outlined)

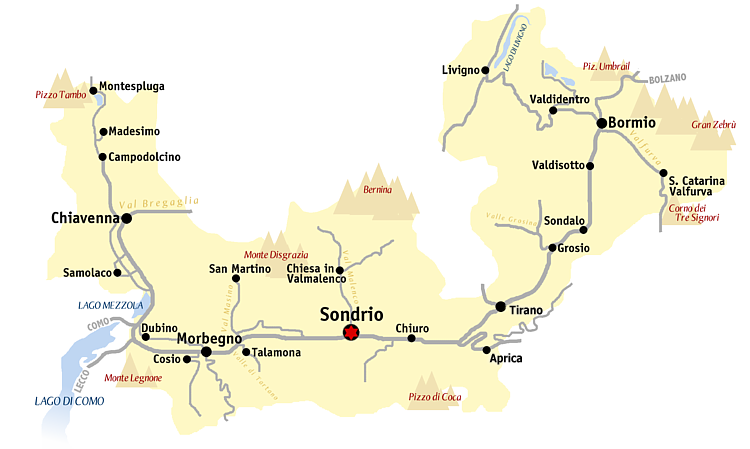
Province of Sondrio: the valley of the Valtellina follows the road through the centre of the province from Lake Como (in the west) to Sondrio and on to Bormio and the Umbrail/Stelvio Passes

In September 1944, Alessandro Pavolini proposed that the regime create an "Alpine stronghold", the Ridotto Alpino Repubblicano ("Republican Alpine Redoubt" or RAR), to mount a last stand against the Allied advance. Pavolini was Fascist Party secretary and founder of the Black Brigades, the regime's paramilitary force and successor to the by then disbanded Blackshirts. The objective of making a last stand in an Alpine stronghold, according to Pavolini, would be to set a heroic example for later generations to follow and, after the inevitable defeat, to inspire a future fascist revolution. The concept was that the stronghold would be well supplied with food and weaponry, defended by elite troops and not dependent on the Germans. Pavolini wrote to Mussolini on 8 September:

Duce, the project – in the deplorable event of a further and almost complete invasion of republican territory – to entrench ourselves with the Blackshirts, our weapons and our government in a defensible area such as the province of Sondrio and part of Como would, it seems to me, be the most logical and worthwhile solution... On the other hand, our resistance in the Valtellina and around Adamello would protect the German flank in South Tyrol. From every point of view, it seems to me, the political and ideal advantage of our ally coincides with our own.

Besides the Valtellina, three other areas were considered. Some in the fascist leadership favoured Val d'Aosta or even Trieste, the latter because its location had echoes of the 1919 Impresa di Fiume. Others preferred South Tyrol. As most of the Italian Alps was under German control and the partisans had taken the areas west of South Tyrol, the only area that potentially could be utilised was the Valtellina, an Alpine valley entered from the northern end of Lake Como.

As a possible stronghold the Valtellina had a number of advantages. The 71 kilometre (44 mi) long valley was protected by mountains and easily defended, had hydroelectric power stations and a hospital even though it was sparsely populated, and was still surrounded by World War I fortifications. Some of these were part of the Cadorna Line defensive system. The western entrance to the valley was covered by the fort of Montecchio, built between 1911 and 1915, which had four armoured turrets with Schneider 145mm cannons. Other forts protected the eastern entrance to the valley, for example, Forte Venini di Oga, which had been built between 1908 and 1912 to defend the passes of the Upper Valtellina. However, it would require some effort to remove the partisans operating in the area. Pavolini strongly advocated the Valtellina, and objected to the South Tyrol, in particular, because it was under German control. On the other hand, Rudolf Rahn, the German Ambassador, advised Mussolini against the Valtellina as he thought the proximity of Switzerland would encourage desertions amongst the troops.

A number of ministers in the government opposed the whole concept. Some were moderates who favoured negotiating a peaceful solution with the partisans. Others thought the proposal was impractical. The Minister of Defence, Marshal Graziani, took the view that because the proposal came from Pavolini, who was closely associated with the Republican Fascist Party, it would compromise the "apolitical" traditions of the army, and opposed it on that basis. The involvement of the Black Brigades in the project made it unpopular with the military hierarchy.

Nevertheless, Mussolini supported the idea and was persuaded by Pavolini's arguments in favour of the Valtellina being the location for it. In mid-September 1944, he commissioned Pavolini to oversee the development of the plan as it had been his idea. At the same time, he rejected the option of retreating to Germany and forming a government-in-exile there. However, after this initial decision, the project drifted with no final decision on its implementation, despite Mussolini appearing to support it. Nevertheless, he told his son Vittorio at the end of 1944 that he was determined to make his last stand in the Valtellina Redoubt.

== Extent of preparations ==
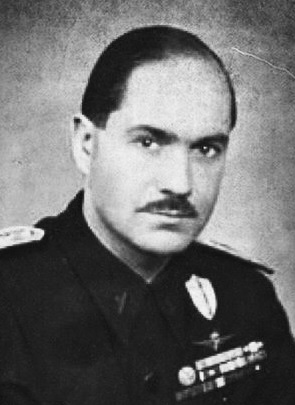
Alessandro Pavolini, the fascist official who first proposed the RAR

During November and December 1944 some initial construction work began under the direction of fascist official, Vincenzo Costa. Costa had supported Pavolini in the advocacy of the project. The work that was completed is generally thought to have been minimal and was limited to the installation of barriers at the valley entrance, and the construction of an anti-tank ditch and some housing. Costa also sent some food stores, four cannons and 10 machine guns.

Historian Pierre Milza wrote that some have argued that the Valtellina Redoubt was an illusory concept and merely propaganda with no substance. However, he believed it was more than that. He noted that in mid-February 1945 partisan units reported large concentrations of Black Brigades in the area and that defence lines had been constructed by building on to the existing World War I fortifications. Another report from April said that 8,000 fascists were stationed in the Valtellina and a further 40,000 were due to arrive from Piedmont, Liguria, Emilia, Romagna and Lombardy.

Nevertheless, a number of reports from eyewitnesses at the time demonstrate that little had been done on the project after the winter of 1944/1945. In March 1945, Giorgio Pini, Fascist under-secretary of the interior, inspected the work and reported that there had been little progress and that the fascists in the Valtellina were in a perilous position. His impression was that 3,000 fascists in the valley were surrounded by 3,000 partisans in the mountains. In the following month, another fascist official, Asvero Gravelli (it) inspected the redoubt and was equally pessimistic, reporting that the roads into the area were not safe for Mussolini and were subject to partisan attack.

In April 1945, Giorgio Pisanò, then an officer in the Republican Guard, visited the area and was shocked by the lack of work that had been completed:

Where is the Alpine Redoubt? What does it consist of? Along the thirty-eight kilometres from the roadblock at Sondrio I saw only blocked up houses, deserted land, no concentration of troops, no fortifications. I knew also that our garrisons formerly existing along the highway...had been withdrawn to Sondrio.

By April 1945, when the allies finally completed their victory in Italy, there were still no detailed plans for the project's completion, no stores or troops defending the redoubt and partisans continued to operate in the area. For the valley to have been an effective final stronghold for the fascists, extensive works would need to have been in progress since January 1945, and this had not been the case.

== Debates within the Regime, March/April 1945 ==
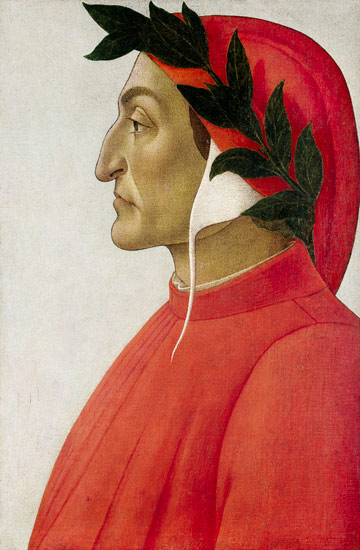
Dante, whose bones Pavolini proposed to transfer to the Valtellina.

The fascist cabinet finally discussed the project in detail at a meeting on 15 March 1945. The Minister of Defence, Marshal Graziani made it clear he was against it. Other ministers expressed concerns, to which Mussolini replied "the retreat in the Valtellina is not obligatory for anyone...Everyone will decide spontaneously." A final decision on action to be taken was not made which meant that the redoubt would not be prepared in time.

The plan was discussed again at a German-Italian military conference on 6 April 1945. The Germans present were appalled by the idea and its lack of planning and organisation. Pavolini continued to be its main advocate and gave it the soubriquet "Epic of the Fifty Thousand". This was a reference to the supposed number of fascist troops that would hold out in the valley. In fact, there was only a small number of fascists soldiers stationed there, mainly besieged in village garrisons by the partisans. Pavolini sent only 750 more in reinforcements. On 10 April 1945, the partisans compiled a report wildly overestimating the fascist strength in the valley at 8,000 with the potential to increase to 40,000.

The final German-Italian meeting on the project was held on 14 April. At the meeting, Mussolini introduced the project as the Ridotto Alpino Repubblicano (meaning Republican Alpine Redoubt) and used the acronym of "RAR". He then asked Pavolini to provide the meeting with details of the plan. Pavolini declared that the Valtellina Redoubt would be "Fascism's Thermopylae", a final stand that would inspire future generations. He spoke of setting up a radio station in the valley to broadcast the final days of the stronghold to the outside world and printing a newspaper in the redoubt which would be air dropped on Italian cities. He also proposed having the bones of the medieval Italian poet, Dante brought to the Valtellina from Ravenna so that "the greatest symbol of Italianness" could be present at fascism's last stand.

Graziani opposed the plan and the German commander present, Heinrich von Vietinghoff dismissed it on the basis that it was poorly planned and there was not enough time to develop it further. General Filippo Diamanti, the fascist military commander in Milan, also opposed the plan on the grounds that it was impractical. He pointed out that Allied aerial bombing could destroy the valley in a day. Pavolini continued to strongly advocate the idea but had to admit that arms and food had yet to be sent to the valley and only 400 soldiers and 350 members of the Black Brigades were stationed there. The meeting ended without conclusion, but Mussolini the following day continued to assert he would make his last stand in the Valtellina.

== Final defeat ==
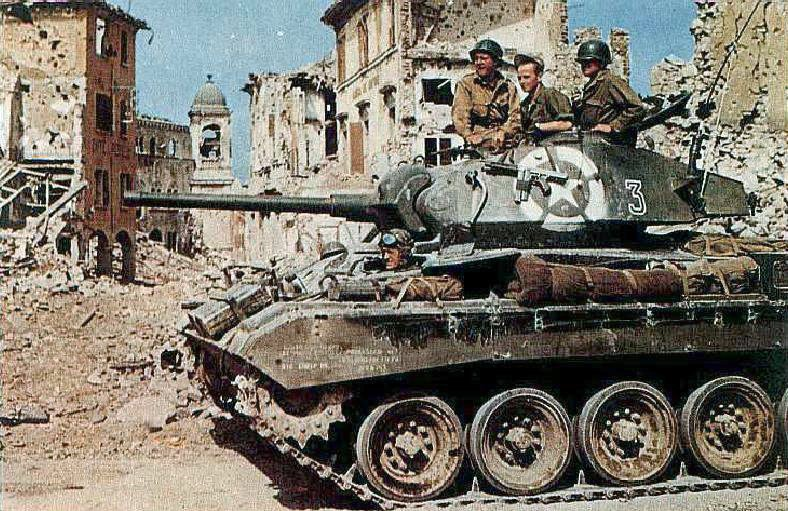
US M24 Chaffee entering Bologna, April 1945

From 18 April 1945, Mussolini based himself in Milan. Over the following week, with the military situation deteriorating and total defeat imminent, he vacillated between a number of options including making a last stand in the Valtellina (to put into effect the RAR), fleeing to Switzerland, or attempting to negotiate a peaceful handover to the partisan leadership.

On 25 April, Mussolini fled the city and headed north. It is unclear whether his objective was to attempt to cross the Swiss border or to go to the Valtellina; if it were the latter, he left the city without the escort of troops earmarked to accompany him to the RAR. In any event, he was captured en route, near Lake Como, and executed by partisans on 28 April 1945, as was Pavolini. The corpses of Mussolini, Pavolini and other executed fascist leaders were then put on public display, hanging by their feet, at a gasoline station in the Piazzale Loreto in Milan.

In the meantime, in the face of the rapid Allied advance across northern Italy, Axis resistance collapsed and there was no "last stand" as the Germans with their fascist allies surrendered or retreated. Allied troops entered Bologna on 21 April, Verona on 25/26 April, Genoa and Milan on 27 April, Venice on 29 April, Turin on 1 May and Trieste on 2 May. On 29 April the German forces signed the Surrender of Caserta, which formally ended the war in Italy on 2 May 1945. Graziani, as Minister of Defence of the Italian Social Republic, surrendered to the Allies on 1 May.

== See also ==
- Alpine Fortress

== Bibliography ==
- Clark, Martin (2014). Mussolini. Routledge. ISBN 978-1-317-89840-5.
- Gallo, Max (2019). Mussolini's Italy: Twenty Years of the Fascist Era. Routledge. ISBN 978-0-429-65543-2.
- Imperial War Museum. "Benito Mussolini: 1883-1945". Imperial War Museums Collections.
- Kaufmann, J. E.; Kaufmann, H. W. (2014). "Chapter 4, section The Vallo Alpino". The Forts & Fortifications of Europe 1815–1945: The Central States: Germany, Austria-Hungry and Czechoslovakia. Pen and Sword. ISBN 978-1-4738-3855-0.
- Kaufmann, J. E.; Kaufmann, H. W. (2022). Fortress Europe: From Stone to Steel Fortifications 1850–1945. Pen and Sword. ISBN 9781399002752.
- Milza, Pierre (2011). "Chapter I: Addio, Milano!". Gli ultimi giorni di Mussolini. Longanesi. ISBN 978-88-304-3134-8.
- Moseley, Ray (2004). Mussolini: The Last 600 Days of Il Duce. Taylor Trade Publications. ISBN 978-1-58979-095-7.
- Neville, Peter (2014). Mussolini. Routledge. ISBN 978-1-317-61304-6.
- Overy, Richard (2015). The Oxford Illustrated History of World War Two. OUP Oxford. ISBN 978-0-19-104538-7.
- Paoletti, Ciro (2008). A Military History of Italy. Greenwood Publishing Group. ISBN 978-0-275-98505-9.
- Payne, Stanley G. (1996). A History of Fascism, 1914–1945. University of Wisconsin Press. ISBN 978-0-299-14873-7.
- Quartermaine, Luisa (2000). Mussolini's Last Republic: Propaganda and Politics in the Italian Social Republic (R.S.I.) 1943–45. Intellect Books. ISBN 978-1-902454-08-5.
- Raffa, Guy P. (2020). Dante's Bones: How a Poet Invented Italy. Harvard University Press. ISBN 978-0-674-98083-9.
- Sharp Wells, Anne (2013). Historical Dictionary of World War II: The War in Germany and Italy. Scarecrow Press. ISBN 978-0-8108-7944-7.
- Sistema Museale Valtellina. "La Storia". Il Forte di Venini di Oga. Servizio Cultura e Istruzione Della Provincia di Sondrio. Archived from the original on 8 June 2022.
- Wilson, Peter H. (2011). The Thirty Years War: Europe's Tragedy. Harvard University Press. ISBN 978-0-674-06231-3.
- Zander, Patrick G. (2020). Fascism through History: Culture, Ideology, and Daily Life [2 volumes]. ABC-CLIO. ISBN 978-1-4408-6194-9.
