= Enrico Vezzalini =

Italian Fascist politician (1904–1945)

Prefect of the Province of Ferrara
- In office 10 December 1943 – 19 July 1944
- Preceded by: Vincenzo Berti
- Succeeded by: Giuseppe Altini
- Prefect of the Province of Novara
- In office 22 July 1944 – 15 January 1945
- Preceded by: Gaspero Barbera
- Succeeded by: Alberto Zaccherini

Personal details
- Born: 16 October 1904 Ceneselli, Kingdom of Italy
- Died: 23 September 1945 (aged 40) Novara, Kingdom of Italy
- Party: National Fascist Party; Republican Fascist Party

Enrico Vezzalini (16 October 1904 – 23 September 1945) was an Italian Fascist politician and civil servant, prefect of the Province of Ferrara and later of Novara during the Italian Social Republic.

== Biography ==
A lawyer, he joined the National Fascist Party (PNF) in his youth, and became provincial commander of the Gioventù Italiana del Littorio. During the interwar period he had a mediocre career as a lawyer, to the point that writer Sebastiano Vassalli defined him as a "second-rate lawyer without causes and without clients"; after the Armistice of Cassibile he joined the Republican Fascist Party (PFR) and made a rapid career in the Italian Social Republic. In November 1943, after the assassination of the Federal Secretary of the Fascist Party of Ferrara, Igino Ghisellini, Vezzalini led the "punitive expedition" that resulted in the execution of eleven anti-Fascists and Jews at the Castello Estense. He was later appointed prefect of Ferrara, leading the crackdown on the local Resistance with the help of the "Giorgi" Company (a special unit of the Republican National Guard), also known as the "Tupin", which soon became known for its tortures, extrajudicial killings and theft from Jews and suspect anti-Fascists.

He was one of the judges of the Special Tribunal for the Defense of the State during the Verona trial, which tried the members of the Grand Council of Fascism who had voted a motion of no confidence against Benito Mussolini on 25 July 1943. He was the most uncompromising and fanatic among the judges, opposing the attempt of another judge, Renzo Montagna, to save the life of the old defendant Emilio De Bono, and accusing other judges who were inclined to show leniency towards some of the defendants of being traitors of Fascism. It was largely owing to his harangues that all defendants, except for Tullio Cianetti, were sentenced to death.

Vezzalini during his trial, 1945

From 22 July 1944 to 15 January 1945 Vezzalini was prefect of Novara; there he directed operations against the partisans, especially in the Ossola Valley, and there he was reached by the "Tupins", commanded by Captain Carlo Tortonesi, which effectively became his bodyguard. A special police squad called "Squadraccia" also operated at his orders, first commanded by police commissioner Emilio Pasqually and later by Lieutenant Vincenzo Martino. The two units, on the orders of Vezzalini, spread terror throughout the province of Novara, committing countless atrocities of which the best known was the Novara massacre of 24 October 1944, in which eleven partisans were tortured and executed. On 22 September 1944, Vezzalini ordered the arrest and internment in concentration camps "of all male relatives, aged 15 to 65, of draft dodgers, deserters and bandits", as well as the confiscation of their assets. After being dismissed from his post as prefect in January 1945, he went to Bologna, but was expelled by the local German command, which accused him of sowing panic among the population with the atrocities committed by his men; he then moved to Modena and later to Genoa, where he was appointed Inspector of the Republican Fascist Party.

In the closing days of the Italian Social Republic, in late April 1945, Vezzalini left Genoa for Como, where he joined Mussolini and the other leaders of the Italian Social Republic. He tried to organize a column of armed vehicles in an attempt to head north, but was arrested by the partisans at a roadblock. After the war he was tried by the Extraordinary Court of Assize of Novara (future President of the Italian Republic Oscar Luigi Scalfaro was public prosecutor at his trial), and in June 1945 he was and sentenced to death for treason and first-degree murders only under Italian law by firing squad, together with five members of the gangs that had operated at his orders. The execution was carried out at the Novara shooting range on September 23, 1945.
