= Vincenzo Costa =

Italian Fascist politician and soldier

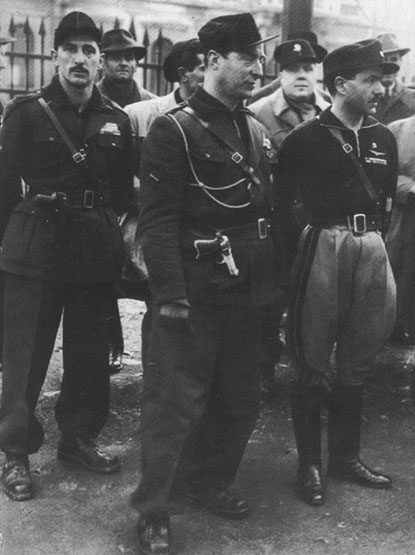
- Costa (center) with Alessandro Pavolini (right) in Milan in late 1944

Federal Secretary of the Republican Fascist Party of Milan
- In office 27 April 1944 – 27 April 1945
- Preceded by: Dante Boattini
- Succeeded by: office abolished

Personal details
- Born: 30 August 1900 Gallarate, Kingdom of Italy
- Died: 27 November 1974 (aged 74) Milan, Italy
- Party: National Fascist Party; Republican Fascist Party

Military service
- Allegiance: Kingdom of Italy; Italian Social Republic
- Branch/service: Royal Italian Army; Black Brigades
- Battles/wars: World War I; World War II; Battle of the Western Alps; Greco-Italian War; Italian occupation of Yugoslavia; Italian campaign on the Eastern Front; Italian Civil War

Vincenzo Costa (30 August 1900 – 27 November 1974) was an Italian Fascist politician and soldier, the last federal secretary of the Fascist Party of Milan.

== Biography ==
Costa was born to a Romagnol father and a Milanese mother, into a family with Risorgimento traditions. At the age of fifteen he enlisted in a paramilitary organization called "Sursum Corda", training with one of the volunteer battalions in his free time during his studies. Two years later, during the Great War, he falsified his identity documents (he was still seventeen) in order to enlist in the Royal Italian Army and join his father, who was already fighting at the front. He thus joined the 5th Alpini Regiment, Edolo Battalion, fighting in Trentino and on the Asiago plateau; during a cadet officer course he met and befriended Aldo Resega. On 4 November 1918 he was among the Italian troops that entered Trento after the battle of Vittorio Veneto.

During the so-called Biennio Rosso Costa became close to the nascent Fascist movement, and in March 1919 he was assaulted during a strike; on 23 March he was among the first to join the Italian Fasces of Combat in Milan, on the day of their establishment, and on the following day he attended Benito Mussolini's rally in Piazza San Sepolcro. On 15 April 1919 he participated in the Fascist assault on the headquarters of the Socialist newspaper Avanti!. Later that month Costa met Giovanni Host-Venturi, captain of the XIII Assault Unit and follower of Gabriele D'Annunzio during the occupation of Fiume, who persuaded him to travel to Fiume, where he was tasked with setting up an autonomous battalion at the orders of D'Annunzio. On 12 February 1920, during a garrison service near Grokovo, Costa was captured by the Carabinieri and imprisoned for several months at the Brenner, due to his refusal to repudiate the Regency of Carnaro. After his release, D'Annunzio made him an intermediary for the correspondence between him and Mussolini; during one of these missions Costa was again arrested in Trieste. After his release, on 4 November 1920 he was once more arrested during clashes between fascists and socialists following a fascist demonstration in Cremona; he was then transferred to Brindisi and assigned to the Italian Expeditionary Corps in Anatolia.

At the end of 1922, after returning from Turkey, Costa left the army and began working at the Officine Meccaniche. His political activity in this period was not significant, being limited to Fascist syndicalism and social assistance; he was an official in the Opera Nazionale Dopolavoro and in 1934 he was appointed secretary of the Rogoredo section of the National Fascist Party. In 1937 he became inspector of the municipal assistance body of Milan, tasked with providing assistance to the city's poor, and member of the Disciplinary Commission of the Milan section of the PNF. After the outbreak of World War II Costa volunteered as an officer in the Alpini, fighting in France, Greece, Croatia, and Russia.

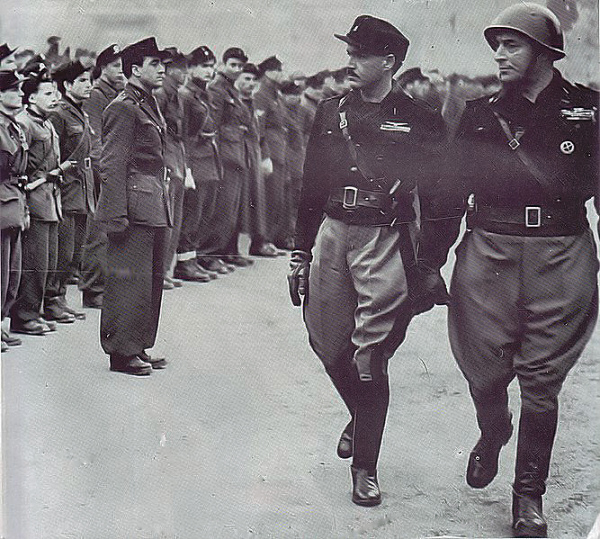
Costa (right) and Alessandro Pavolini review the troops of the 8th Black Brigade "Aldo Resega", summer of 1944

After the Armistice of Cassibile Costa joined the Italian Social Republic and was appointed deputy federal secretary of the Republican Fascist Party of Milan, while his old friend Resega became federal secretary. After Resega's assassination by the GAP in December 1943, Dante Boattini replaced him as federal secretary; on 27 April 1944 Costa replaced Boattini, thus becoming the last federal secretary of the PFR of Milan. He also assumed command of the 8th Black Brigade "Also Resega" of Milan.

In late April 1945, as the Italian Social Republic collapsed, Costa left Milan for Como, where thousands of soldiers and officials of the RSI had gathered; there he signed an agreement with the local National Liberation Committee and a representative of the Allies, stating that he would leave Como with his men and retreat to the Val d'Intelvi, in the mountains near the Swiss border, where he would wait for the arrival of the Allies in order to surrender to them. In the morning of 27 April he thus left Como at the head of a column of 123 vehicles and 3,300 men, but by the time the column reached Moltrasio most of its members had dispersed and accepted safe conducts offered by the partisans in exchange for their surrender. After a fruitless attempt to rally his men, Costa departed with the few who had remained loyal, but in Carate Urio they were halted and captured by the partisans. Upon capture, Costa tried to commit suicide, but a partisan grabbed the gun he had aimed at his temple and took it away before he could fire. He was imprisoned in Como, then in prisoner-of-war camps in Piacenza and Coltano and finally in the San Vittore Prison of Milan, along with Vittorio Mussolini, being tried for collaborationism and sentenced to eighteen years in prison, but was released in October 1949. After his release he founded the "Committee for the honors of the fallen and missing of the Italian Social Republic" and in 1966 he promoted the creation of Campo Dieci at the Cimitero Maggiore di Milano, where the remains of the one thousand fallen of the Italian Social Republic were gathered and where he was buried at his request after his death in 1974.
