= Francesco Colombo =

Francesco Colombo may refer to:

- Francesco Colombo (gymnast)
- Francesco Colombo (soldier)
