= La Disperata =

Italian fascist bodyguard regiment

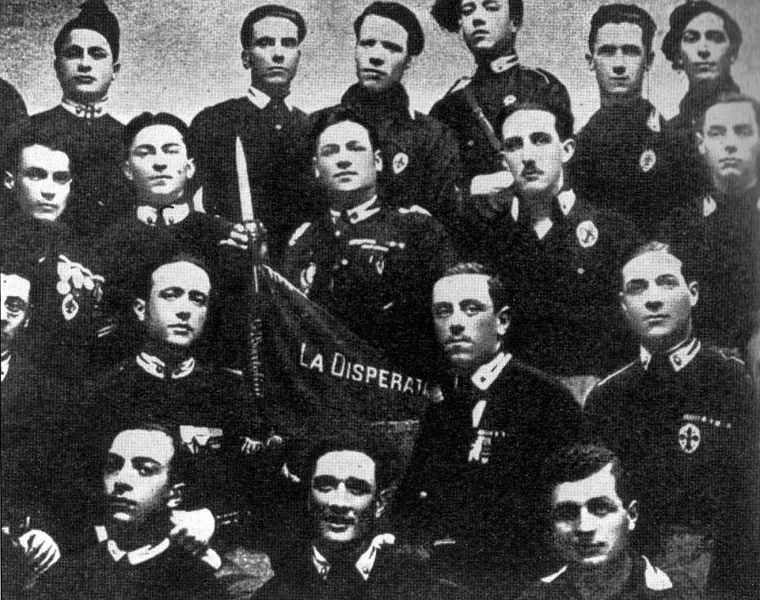
La Disperata squadra in Florence.

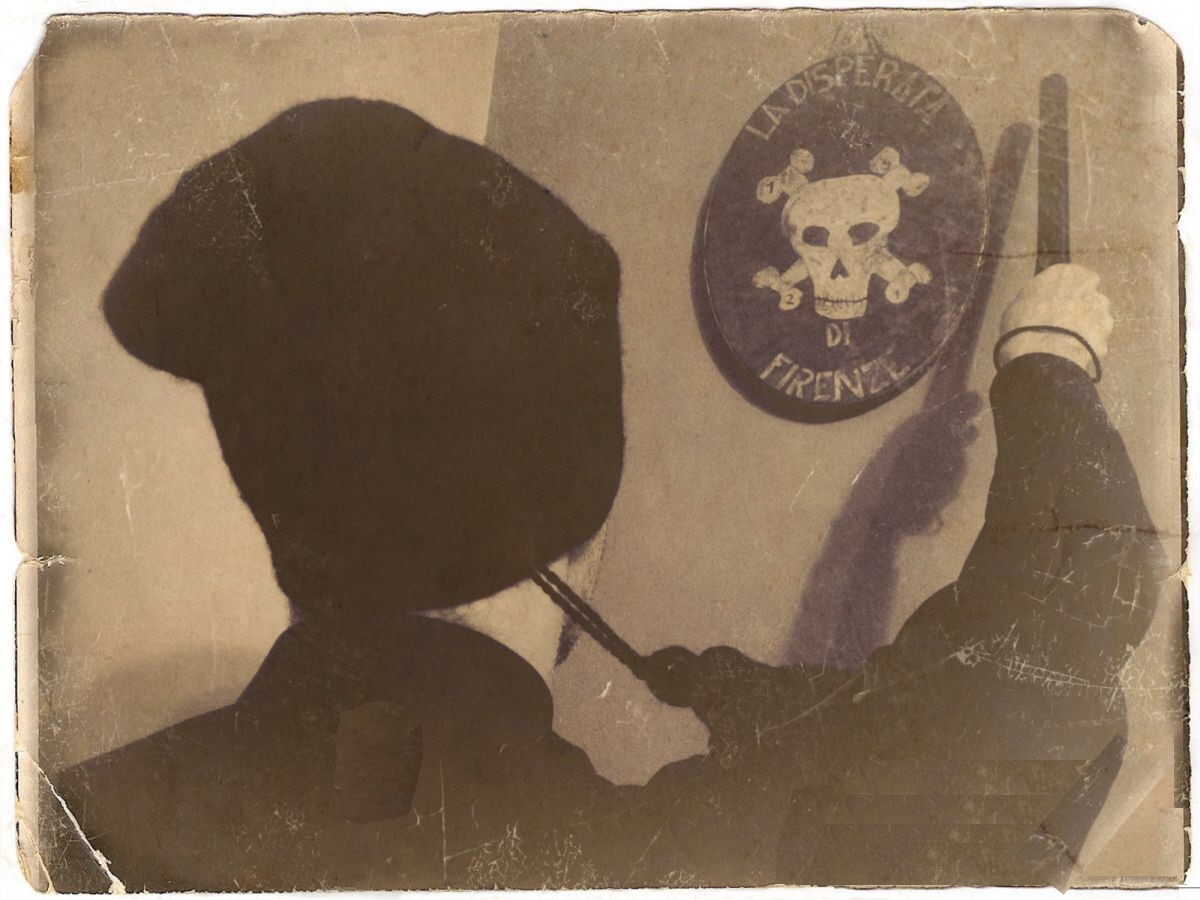
A member of La Disperata in Florence.

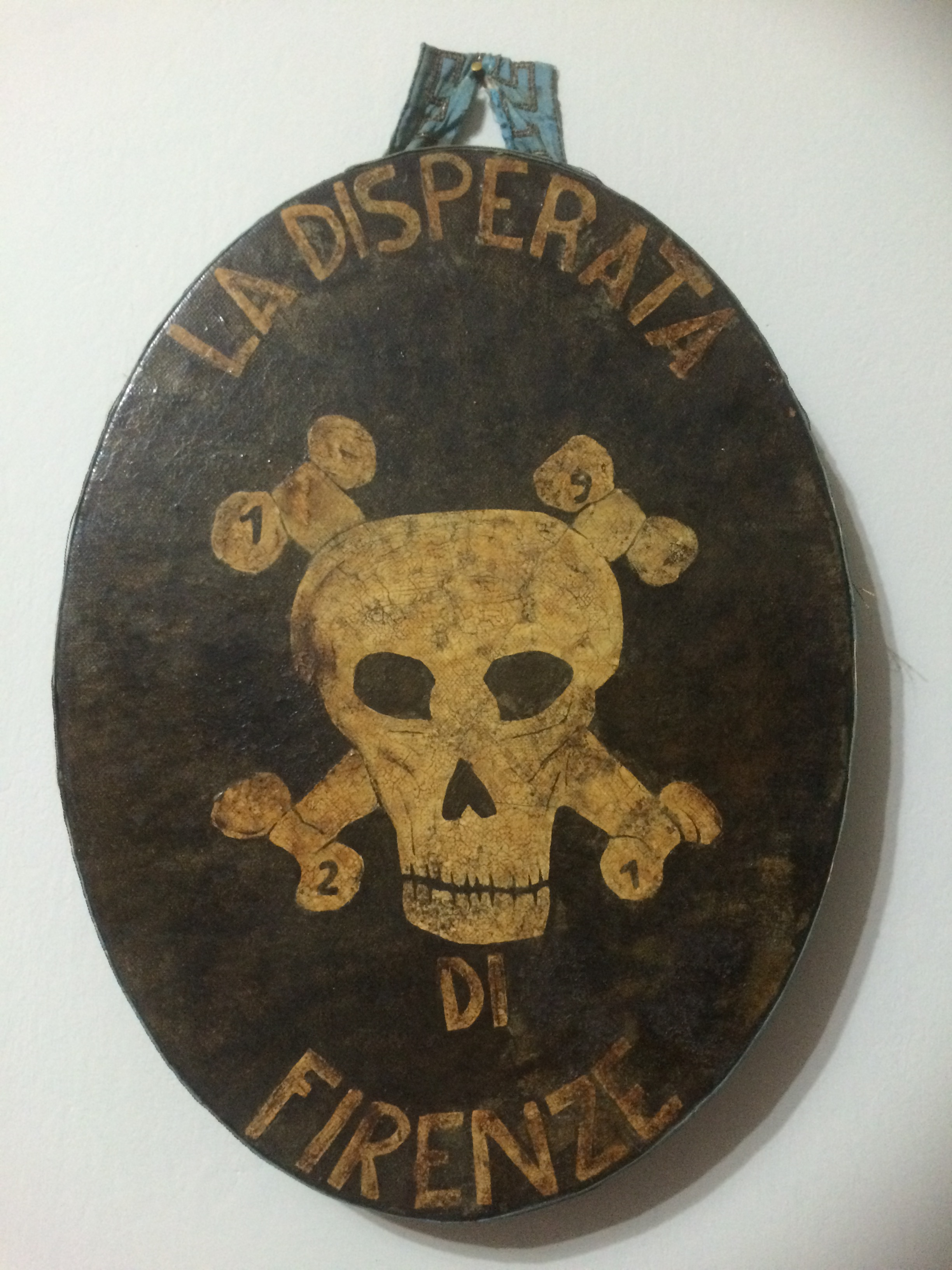
Insignia painted in canvas shown in the picture above

La Disperata was the name given to the group of bodyguards who protected Gabriele D'Annunzio. It was taken up in turn by a number of later squadre and fascist military units in Italy between 1921 and 1945.

== At Fiume ==
The origins of the name go back to the Fiume expedition of 1919. The writer Gabriele D'Annunzio seized control of the city, planning to unify it with the Kingdom of Italy, and creating the short-lived Italian Regency of Carnaro. Guido Keller formed a military corps from volunteers who has made their way to Fiume from Italy and had camped out in the city's shipyards. Keller experimented with his ideas of a new military order, making them march bare-chested and singing through the streets of the city. In the evenings they gathered at a restaurant called “La Torretta”, where they started hand grenade fights. This corps took the name La Disperata meaning “(the guard) of desperate men”, and became famous among the arditi and fascists for their fearlessness and the charisma of its leaders.

== Squadre ==
The first squadra to take the name was formed in Florence on 14 March 1921. It had twenty-one members.

“So a squadra was launched at the head of which was placed an Arditi lieutenant, naturally one decorated for valour, with four former combatant officers, two Arditi sergeants, two others who had been at Fiume, three students, one employee and a commercial traveler, also was also a student in his spare time. We also thought about the name, and after much deliberation, we decided on “La Disperata”, in honour of D'Annunzio’s bodyguard. And the squadra, with its members and its team as a whole, with its members and its crazy name, was so popular that after a few days we could no longer hold back the press of people wanting to join and we had to let others in, choosing them one by one from among the daredevils.

The name was then taken up by squadre in other cities including Bari, Brescia, Caltanissetta, Cosenza, Genoa, Gorizia, Livorno, Lodi, Modena, Padua, Parma, Portici, Turin, Treviso and Venice. Foligno and Perugia adopted the variant La Disperatissima (“the most desperate”).

== Air force squadrons ==
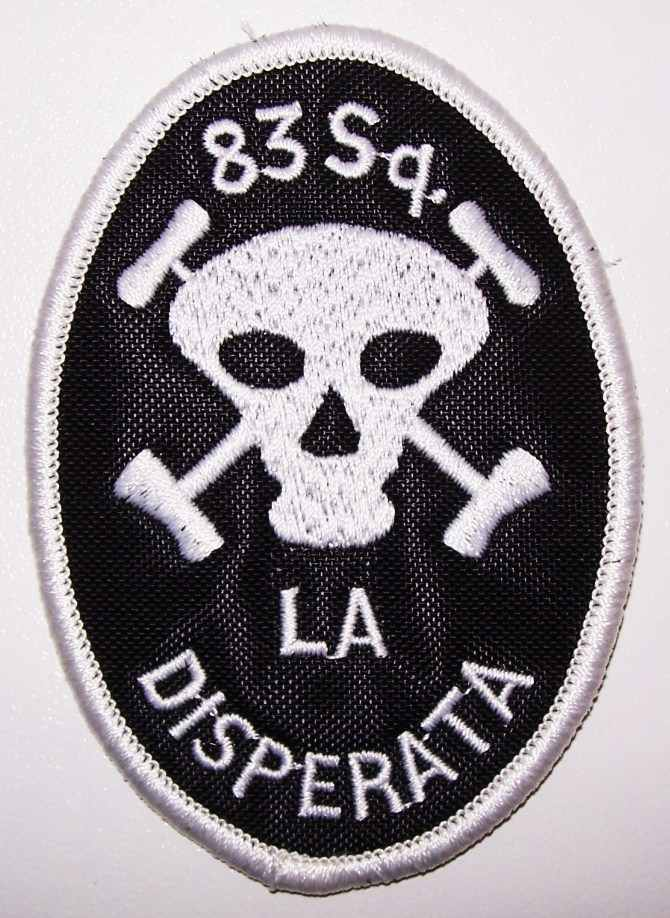
Insignia of the 83rd fighter squadron La Disperata.

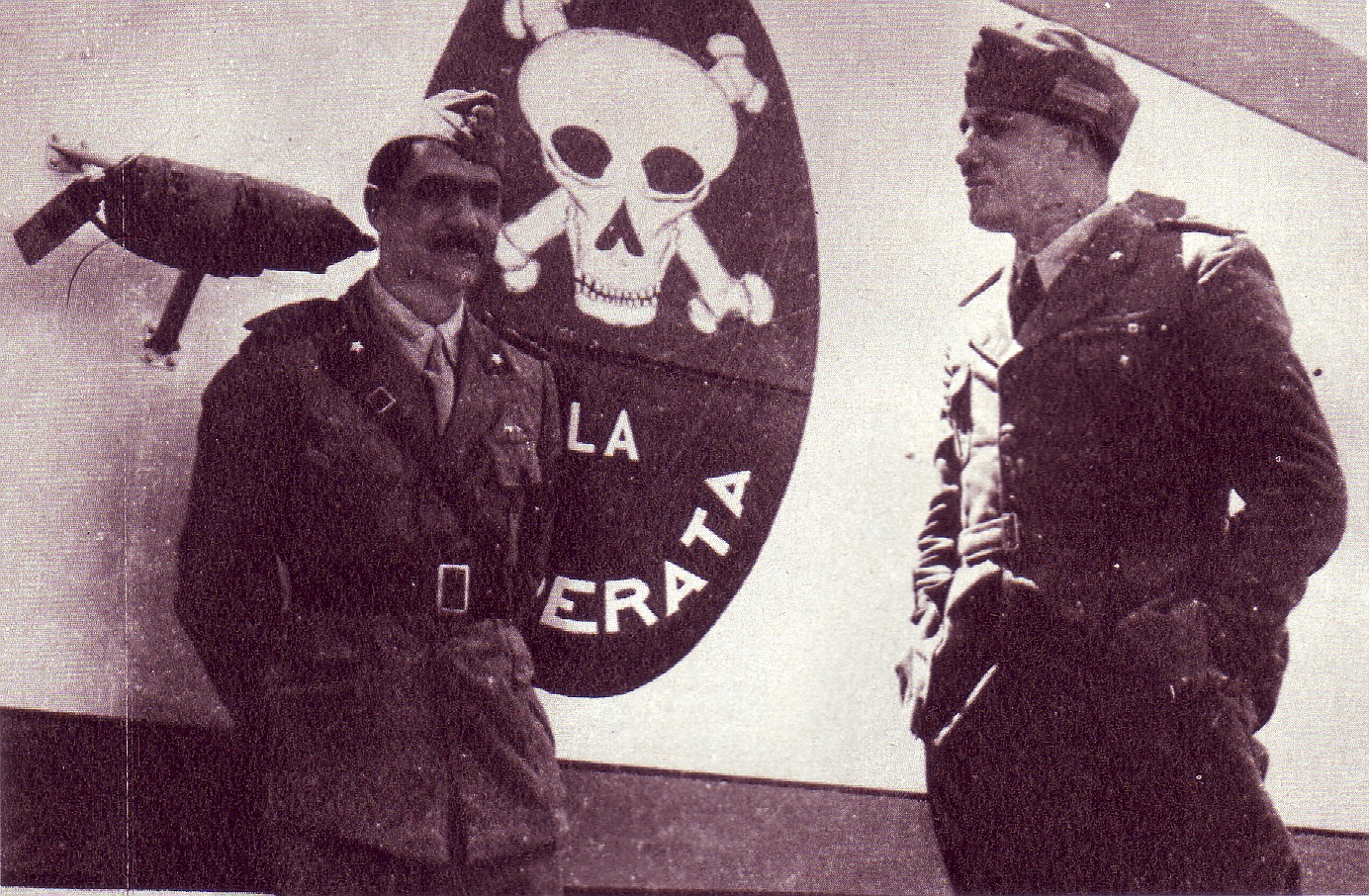
Alessandro Pavolini with the 15th bomber squadron La Disperata, 1935.

The name La Disperata was adopted by the 83rd Squadron and the 15th Caproni Bomber Squadron of the Regia Aeronautica. The Caproni squadron took part in the Second Italo-Ethiopian War (1935–1936) under the command of Galeazzo Ciano.
