= Aldo Resega =

Italian Fascist politician and soldier

Federal Secretary of the Republican Fascist Party of Milan
- In office 13 September 1943 – 18 December 1943
- Preceded by: office established
- Succeeded by: Dante Boattini

Personal details
- Born: 16 September 1896 Milan, Kingdom of Italy
- Died: 18 December 1943 (aged 47) Milan, Italian Social Republic
- Party: National Fascist Party; Republican Fascist Party

Military service
- Allegiance: Kingdom of Italy; Italian Social Republic
- Branch/service: Royal Italian Army; MVSN
- Rank: Lieutenant Colonel
- Battles/wars: World War I; Battles of the Isonzo; Second Battle of Monte Grappa; Battle of Vittorio Veneto; Second Italo-Ethiopian War; World War II; Italian invasion of France; Greco-Italian War; Yugoslav front
- Awards: Silver Medal of Military Valor (twice); Bronze Medal of Military Valor (three times); War Cross of Military Valor; War Merit Cross (twice)

Arnaldo Resega, known as Aldo Resega (16 September 1896 – 18 December 1943) was an Italian Fascist politician and soldier.

== Biography ==
Born in Milan in 1896 from Anacleto Resega and Maria Allievi, he participated in the First World War with the rank of infantry lieutenant, receiving a Silver Medal of Military Valor for courage displayed during the battle of Caporetto. When the Arditi were created, he volunteered for service with them and obtained command a small Arditi company, which he led across the Piave river during the battle of Vittorio Veneto, capturing a large number of prisoners and earning a Bronze Medal of Military Valor.

After the end of the war, Resega became a squadrista and joined the National Fascist Party, participating in the march on Rome. In 1936 he volunteered for the Second Italo-Ethiopian War with the rank of centurione (captain), commanding an Arditi company of the 6th CC.NN. Division "Tevere" and being awarded another bronze medal of military valor. During the Second World War he participated in operations on the Western Front, the Greek-Albanian front, in Croatia and Dalmatia, reaching the rank of lieutenant colonel and receiving another silver and a bronze medal of military valor. Declared a war invalid for wounds suffered in combat, he was repatriated and on 5 June 1943 he was appointed federal inspector of the PNF in his native Milan.

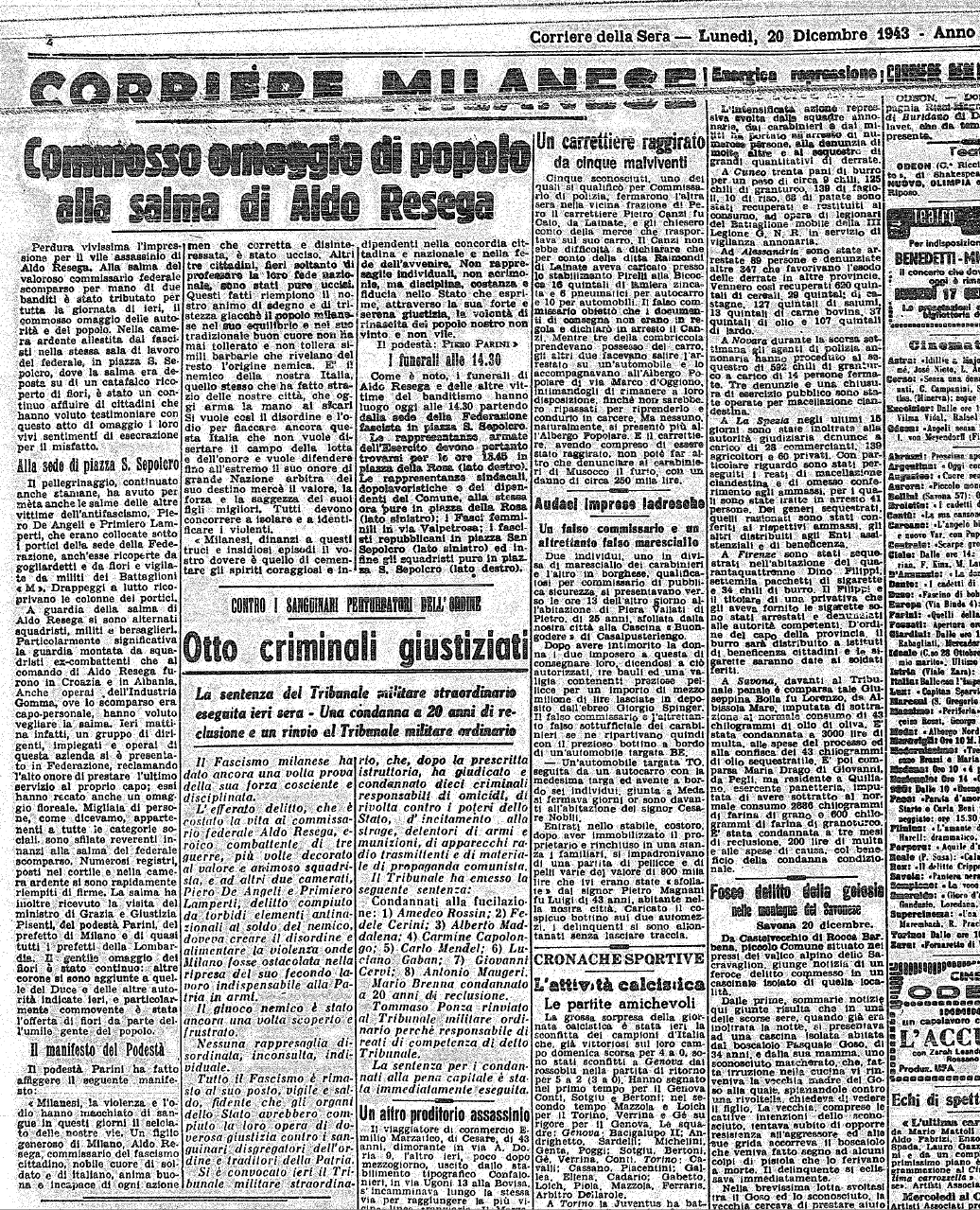
Issue of the Corriere della Sera with the news of Resega's funeral and the execution of the eight anti-Fascists

After the fall of the Fascist regime and the Armistice of Cassibile, on 13 September 1943 Resega re-established the Milanese section of the PNF, then joining the Italian Social Republic and being appointed federal secretary of the Milan section of the Republican Fascist Party. His son Gianfranco enlisted as an officer in the Republican National Guard. According to Gianni Oliva, Resega represented the "moderate" faction of the Milanese Fascists, trying to curb excesses of the most hardliner elements, led by Francesco Colombo. Nevertheless, his position as head of the Milanese fascists made him a target for the Gruppi di Azione Patriottica, and in the evening of 18 December 1943 he was ambushed and shot dead in front of his home by three GAP members. Eight anti-Fascists were executed in reprisal on the following day at the Arena Civica; the GAP in turn opened fire on Resega's funeral procession on 20 December. When the Black Brigade of Milan was established in 1944, it was named after Resega.
