= Black Brigades =

Auxiliary police unit of the Republican Fascist Party

Auxiliary Corps of the Black Shirts' Action Squads
- Corpo Ausiliario delle Squadre d'azione di Camicie Nere
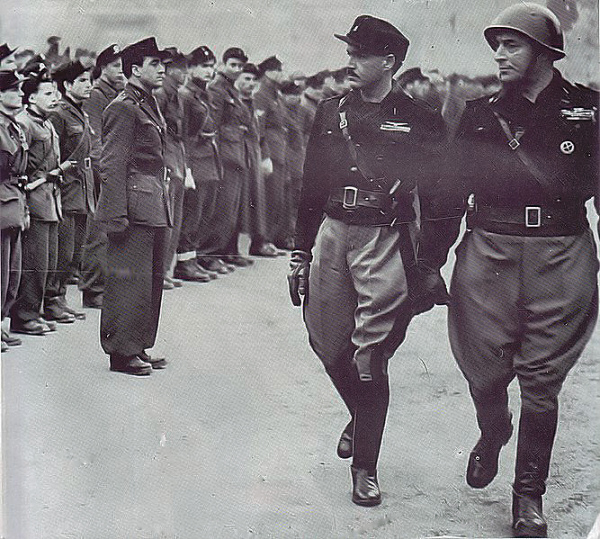
- Alessandro Pavolini, commander-in-chief of the Black Brigades (left) and Vincenzo Costa (right) review the troops of the 8th Black Brigade "Aldo Resega", summer of 1944
- Active: 30 June 1944 – 25 April 1945
- Country: Italian Social Republic
- Allegiance: Republican Fascist Party
- Type: Paramilitary
- Role: Auxiliary police, anti-guerrilla gendarmerie
- Size: 110,000
- Garrison/HQ: Cesano Maderno, Milan
- Mottos: "Belli come la vita, neri come la morte" ("Beautiful as life, black as death")
- Colors: Black
- March: "Stornelli delle Brigate Nere" ("Stornello of the Black Brigades")
- Engagements: World War II: Italian Civil War

Commanders
- Commander: Alessandro Pavolini

Insignia
- Insignia of the Black Brigades

The Auxiliary Corps of the Black Shirts' Action Squads (Italian: Corpo Ausiliario delle Squadre d'azione di Camicie Nere), most widely known as the Black Brigades (Italian: Brigate Nere), was one of the fascist paramilitary groups, organized and run by the Republican Fascist Party (Partito Fascista Repubblicano, PFR) operating in the Italian Social Republic (in northern Italy), during the final years of World War II, and after the signing of the Armistice of Cassibile in 1943. They were officially led by Alessandro Pavolini, former Minister of Culture of the fascist era during the last years of Fascist Italy.

== History ==
=== Background ===
On 25 July 1943 Italian dictator, Benito Mussolini, was arrested after the Italian Grand Council of Fascism (Gran Consiglio del Fascismo), with the support of King Victor Emmanuel III, overthrew him and began negotiations with the Allies for Italy's withdrawal from the war. The Italian government was taken over by Marshal Pietro Badoglio, who outlawed the National Fascist Party (Partito Nazionale Fascista, PNF) and confiscated all of its assets.

On 12 September Mussolini was rescued in the Gran Sasso raid by German Luftwaffe Fallschirmjäger (paratroopers) led by General Kurt Student and the Waffen-SS Obersturmbannführer (Lieutenant Colonel), Otto Skorzeny. He was then installed by the Germans as the President of the Italian Social Republic (RSI). The RSI was to be an Italian regime which was to nominally administer German-occupied northern Italy. As the Milizia Volontaria per la Sicurezza Nazionale (MVSN, also known as "Blackshirts", Camicie Nere) had been disbanded in August by the terms of the armistice, the Guardia Nazionale Repubblicana was formed on 24 November 1943, and was to constitute the new fascist police force. The Guardia Nazionale Repubblicana was formed out of local police, ex-army, ex-Blackshirts and others still loyal to the fascist cause.

Anti-fascist political forces in Northern Italy, on their side, decided to oppose in arms the RSI and the German occupants, and began to recruit armed clandestine formations for guerrilla and urban warfare, with support from the Allies. Soon, a bloody civil war started in northern Italy.

=== Constitution ===
However, as soon as the fascist party in the RSI was reopened and reorganized as Republican Fascist Party (Partito Fascista Repubblicano - PFR), its members began to organize "private" armed units, to protect themselves and party officials from attacks by Italian resistance fighters, who actually started very soon to target RSI authorities and supporters. RSI manpower proved to be insufficient, and Italian authorities decided to organize all fascist party volunteer units in a dedicated structure, and to raise new forces. The Black Brigades were formed by members of the Republican Fascist Party. Formation of the Black Brigades was sanctioned by a Fascist Republican Party decree issued personally by Benito Mussolini, head of PFR and of the RSI government, dated 30 June 1944, stating that all existing fascist armed units were to be enlisted into a military organization called Corpo Ausiliario delle Squadre d'Azione di Camicie Nere, and that every local Federation of the PFR (there was one in every Italian province) had to raise a military unit drafting personnel from its members. Units so formed were to be called "Black Brigades", and were to be commanded by the local Federal Secretary of the PFR, with the rank of Major or Colonel.

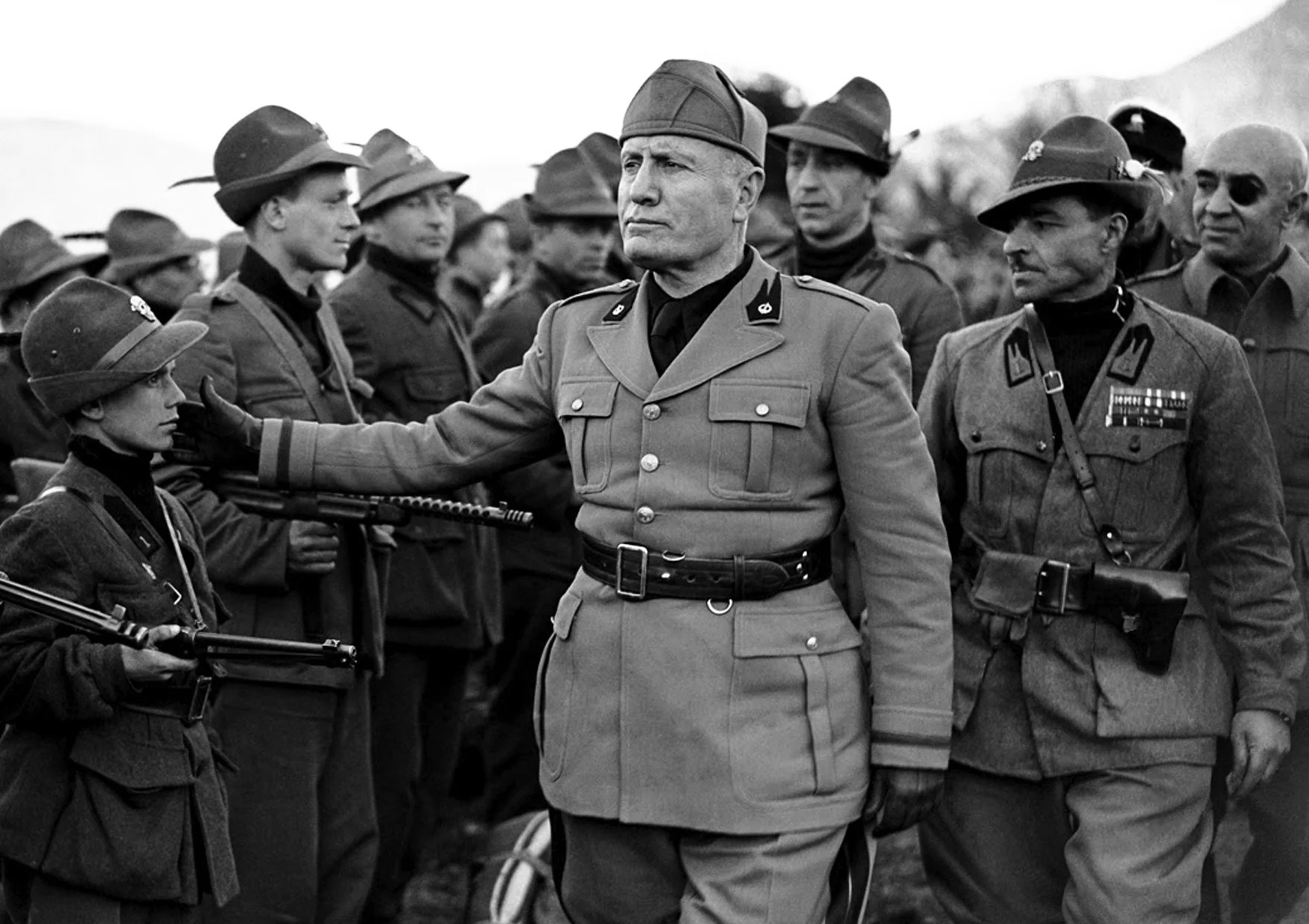
Mussolini reviews 5th Alpine Mobile Black Brigade "E. Quagliata", Brescia, 1945.

Their duties were:

- to provide security for the members and assets of the PFR;
- to cooperate with German and Italian law enforcement authorities;
- to help military authorities in counter-insurgency operations.

This measure was to be both a response to resistance attacks against fascist members, and to turn the PFR into a fighting force to cope with shortage of manpower for internal security. Moreover, Mussolini and other fascist leaders felt that the Fascist Party was more true to its ideology if brought back to its original spirit when it was manned mainly by soldiers and veterans and was above all a fighting organization. In this optic, they decided to mobilize it for war duties, under the concept that every fascist was to be first of all a combatant, and had to take arms for the defence of Italy and fascism. Black Brigades membership was compulsory for all members of the PFR deemed fit for such duties. Members were officially called Squadristi (Squad-men) (like the very first fascist Black Shirts of the 1920s), and were divided into three categories: Squadristi Permanenti (Full-time squad-men), Ausiliari di pronto impiego (Ready Response Auxiliaries), Ausiliari (Auxiliaries). Only full-time personnel were required to be on duty daily, while the other two categories were to be mobilized only in case of emergency. Black Brigade members were entitled to police powers, to carry firearms and to circulate freely even during curfew. Full-time personnel received a monthly wage of ITL 200.00.

=== Operational service ===
Police effectiveness of Black Brigades was feeble at best. Aside from particularly strong and well-equipped Brigades (such as VIIIth "Aldo Resega" of Milan, 2000 strong) that were exceptions, the average Black Brigades were at most 2-300 men strong, poorly equipped and armed, with little if any military training, and were hardly in conditions to defend themselves from partisan attacks, not to mention provide support to military authorities.

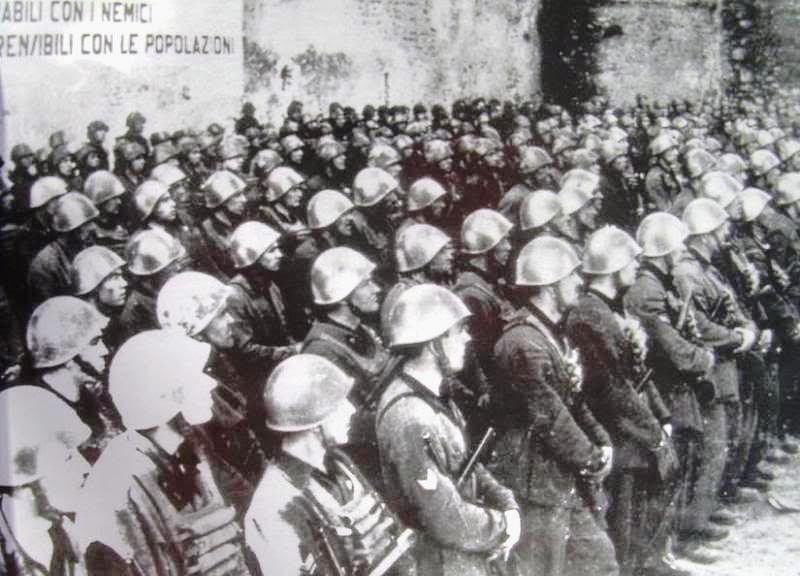
The Black Brigade "Marcello Turchetti" of Mantua, before one of its last actions in the closing days of the war, April 1945

Many of their members were obscure figures evicted from the police or army, and conspicuous were also the hardline fascists who were pushed by resentment and revenge towards that part of the Italian population who, in their eyes, betrayed the Fascist regime. Many were also old "Squadristi" fascists who had served in the '20s, and who were eager to retake a first-place role in the ranks of the Fascist Party. In general terms, poor average discipline made all these individuals difficult to control, and prone to abuses. As the military situation worsened, German mistrust towards the RSI military grew, and even Social Republic authorities looked at the Black Brigades with contempt. All these factors contributed to pushing the Black Brigades into political radicalization and increasingly hostile behaviour towards the population itself, among which they gained a fearsome reputation for fanatical brutality and summary procedures. Apart from a few Black Brigades who had been found reliable enough to be committed in regular combat against partisans and Allies, most of these formations had poor military or even police capabilities and were mainly employed in static guard duties, patrols, and were often unleashed in brutal reprisals and retaliations against partisan attacks and ambushes to RSI military personnel.

The Brigade members not only fought the Allies and the Italian partisans, but they also fought against political opponents and other Black Brigade members whose support of "the cause" was deemed less than exuberant. Many Black Brigade members were killed in this type of in-fighting.

After the armistice (April 25, 1945) and the end of the war in Italy, many members of the Black Brigades suffered harsh reprisals from partisan forces.

=== War crimes ===
The Black Brigades were frequently involved in support of German units during anti-partisan operations which resulted in massacres of the Italian civilian population, like at the Sant'Anna di Stazzema massacre in Tuscany where the 36th (?) helped the SS kill the entire village population of around 560 persons in August 1944. Or the Vinca massacre where 162 civilians were executed and where the 40. Brigata nera “Vittorio Ricciarelli” di Livorno was involved.

== Uniforms ==
Members of Black Brigades were issued standard Italian army uniforms, and they tended to wear them with a black turtleneck sweater, or (in summer) the famous black shirt, as the symbol of loyalty to Mussolini and membership of the Republican Fascist Party. They sometimes wore this uniform with a windproof jacket in solid or camouflage colours. Members of Black Brigades tended to wear the grey-green uniform pants, but a wide array of uniforms were issued and, especially in the closing stages of the war, Black Brigades members used just anything they could obtain: army camouflaged one-piece suits, smocks and pants, paratroopers' collarless jump jackets (very popular), tropical Italian army uniforms, German pants and feldjacken, and frequently local produced uniforms and gear.

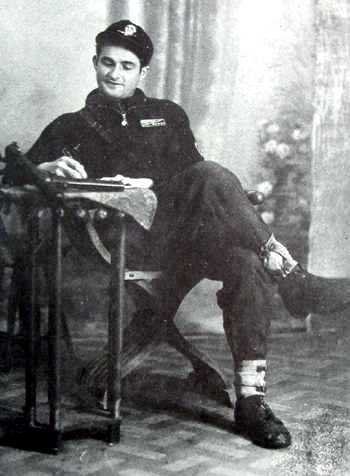
Member of the 16th Black Brigade of Varese, 1945. The soldier wears the black, Italian Army–issue uniform, worn by the Black Brigades, consisting of German-type, M43 cap, similar to the German Feldmutze, with metal skull insignia, and a black sweater with the square metallic badge of his brigade. Also, armed with a British Sten MkII, submachine gun, likely from an intercepted British, small arms, airdrop or taken in battle.

The badge or insignia of the Black Brigades was the jawless death's head, with a dagger in its teeth, or one of assorted Italian versions. Collar tabs were issued, unique to the Black Brigades, consisting in square-shaped tabs with a pointed tip, of solid black cloth, on which was pinned a bright red republican fascio, in the lower part. In the upper part, every Brigade chose its own insignia: either one of the many variants of skulls (with or without crossbones) or coloured facing. Regulations prescribed for all members of the Black Brigades to wear a metal enamelled breast badge, of roundel shape, showing a golden fascio amidst Italian national colours in vertical stripes, and surrounded by a black enamel rim with the inscription: "Corpo Ausiliario delle Squadre d'Azione di Camicie Nere", in capital letters, and in the lower part the identification number of the Brigade. Contemporary pictures show that this badge however, although certainly issued on a large scale, was not so often worn.

Many Black Brigades adopted sleeve badges, following Italian military tradition, both cloth and metal. These were usually of very fine workmanship, often minted and enamelled, and are today high-priced collector's items. Rank insignias were the same as those prescribed for the Italian army; however, were rarely worn. Towards the end of the war, a specific rank system was introduced for the Black Brigades, unique to them, but it does not seem to have ever been implemented.

The majority of Black Brigade members wore Italian army ski caps or berets dyed black. Some photos show members also wearing black German-style caps. Some were Italian-made, some were supplied by Germany. Combat headgear was the ubiquitous M33 olive-green helmet, sometimes adorned with Black Brigades' skull insignia. German M35 helmets were also used as were M33 black MVSN helmets. Helmets were often sprayed with various camouflage patterns as was very common in that period. Combat gear and carrying equipment was the same as army soldiers. Samurai magazine vest, originally intended for elite army units, was widely used and so were a vast sorting of pouches, magazine-holders, holsters, both official issue (Italian or German) and privately made, carried on Italian M1908 olive-green leather carrying equipment.

Cap badge of the Black Brigades

== Ranks ==
The Black Brigades wore a simple fourragère denoting rank.

Insignia	Rank	Translisteration	Comparative rank
	Comandante di Brigata	Brigadier	Colonel
	Comandante di Battaglione/ Vice-Comandante di Brigata	Battalion commander/ assistant brigade commander	Major
	Comandante di Compagnia	Company commander	Captain
	Comandante di Plotone	Platoon leader	Master sergeant
	Comandante di Squadra	Squad leader	Sergeant

== Weapons ==
- Carcano Rifles and Carbines
- MAB38
- FNAB-43
- TZ-45
- Beretta M34
- Beretta M35
- Glisenti Model 1910
- Bodeo M89
- Breda M30
- Breda M35

== Organization ==
The Black Brigades were not actually brigade-sized units. The Italian word brigata has a looser meaning as a synonym of "group" or "assembly". Most Black Brigades were typically weak battalions or strong companies, each comprising 200 to 300 men; the size of a brigade however varied greatly depending on the city where it was based and where it recruited its men, with Black Brigades of major cities comprising thousands of men (the 8th Black Brigade "Aldo Resega" of Milan, for instance, had over 4,000 troops, and the 1st Black Brigade "Ather Capelli" of Turin had over 2,000). There were 41 territorial brigades. The territorial brigades were numbered 1 through 41. There were also seven "independent" and eight "mobile" brigades. The mobile brigades were numbered 1 through 7, plus the Second Arditi Brigade.

- Piedmont Regional Inspectorate
  - I Brigata Nera "Ather Capelli" Turin
  - II Brigata Nera "Attilio Prato" Alessandria
  - III Brigata Nera "Emilio Picot" Aosta
  - IV Brigata Nera "Luigi VIale" Asti
  - V Brigata Nera "Carlo Lidonnici" Cuneo
  - VI Brigata Nera "Augusto Cristina" Novara
  - VII Brigata Nera "Bruno Ponzecchi" Vercelli
- Lombardy Regional Inspectorate
  - VIII Brigata Nera "Aldo Resega" Milan
  - IX Brigata Nera "Giuseppe Cortesi" Bergamo
  - X Brigata Nera "Enrico Tognu" Brescia
  - XI Brigata Nera "Cesare Rodini" Como
  - XII Brigata Nera "Augusto Felisari" Cremona
  - XIII Brigata Nera "Marcello Turchetti" Mantua
  - XIV Brigata Nera "Alberto Alfieri" Pavia
  - XV Brigata Nera "Sergio Gatti" Sondrio
  - XVI Brigata Nera "Dante Gervasini" Varese
- Veneto regional Inspectorate
  - XVII Brigata Nera "Bartolomeo Asara" Venice
  - XVIII Brigata Nera "Luigi Begon" Padua
  - XIX Brigata Nera "Romolo Gori" Rovigo
  - XX Brigata Nera "Francesco Cappellini" Treviso
  - XXI Brigata Nera "Stefano Rizzardi" Verona
  - XXII Brigata Nera "Antonio Faggion" Vicenza
- Emilia Regional Inspectorate
  - XXIII Brigata Nera "Eugenio Facchini" Bologna
  - XXIV Brigata Nera "Igino Ghisellini" Ferrara
  - XXV Brigata Nera "Arturo Capanni" Forlì
  - XXVI Brigata Nera "Mirko Pistoni" Modena
  - XXVII Brigata Nera "Virginio Gavazzoli" Parma
  - XXVIII Brigata Nera "Pippo Astorri" Piacenza
  - XXIX Brigata Nera "Ettore Muti" Ravenna
  - XXX Brigata Nera "Umberto Rosi" Reggio Emilia
- Liguria Regional Inspectorate
  - XXXI Brigata Nera "Generale Silvio Parodi" Genoa
  - XXXII Brigata Nera "Antonio Padoan" Imperia
  - XXXIII Brigata Nera "Tullio Bertoni" La Spezia
  - XXXIV Brigata Nera "Giovanni Briatore" Savona
- Tuscany Black Brigades
  - XXXV Brigata Nera "Don Emilio Spinelli" Arezzo
  - XXXVI Brigata Nera "Benito Mussolini" Lucca
  - XXXVII Brigata Nera "Emilio Tanzi" Pisa
  - XXXVIII Brigata Nera "Ruy Blas Biagi" Pistoia
  - XXXIX Brigata Nera Siena
  - XL Brigata Nera "Vittorio Ricciarelli" Apuania
  - XLI Brigata Nera "Raffaele Manganiello" Florence
- Mobile Black Brigades Grouping
  - I Brigata Nera Mobile "Vittorio Ricciarelli" Milan
  - II Brigata Nera Mobile "Danilo Mercuri" Padua
  - III Brigata Nera Mobile "Attilio Pappalardo" Bologna
  - IV Brigata Nera Mobile "Aldo Resega" Dronero-Cuneo
  - V Brigata Nera Mobile "Enrico Quagliata" Val Camonica
  - VI Brigata Nera Mobile "Dalmazia" Milan
  - VII Brigata Nera Mobile "Tevere" Milan
  - II Brigata Nera Mobile Arditi Milan
- Autonomous Black Brigades
  - Brigata Nera Autonoma "Giovanni Gentile"
  - Brigata Nera Autonoma Operativa "Giuseppe Garibaldi"
  - Brigata Nera Autonoma Ministeriale
  - Brigata Nera Autonoma - Marche
  - Brigata Nera Autonoma - Gorizia
  - Brigata Nera Autonoma - Udine
  - Brigata Nera Autonoma "Tullio Cividino" - Trieste
- Outremer Autonomous Black Brigades
  - Compagnia Complementare Fascisti - Rhodes

== See also ==
- 29th Waffen Grenadier Division of the SS (1st Italian)

Other Axis nations:

- Volkssturm (Germany)
- Volunteer Fighting Corps (Japan)

== General sources ==
- Le Forze Armate della RSI - Pier Paolo Battistelli, Andrea Molinari, p. 123
- Le Forze Armate della RSI - Pier Paolo Battistelli, Andrea Molinari, p. 125
- Ferrari, Saverio (13 October 2002). "Le SS italiane". Liberazione (in Italian). Milan.
- Mario Pellegrinetti. Giugno 1944 - I sabotaggi. La guerra civile in Garfagnana. URL consultato il 9-1-2008.
- Giampaolo Pansa, Il gladio e l'alloro - l'esercito di Salò, 1943-45 - Le Scie/A. Mondadori editore 1991
- Giorgio Pisanò, Gli ultimi in grigioverde - Voll. I-II-III - FPE edizioni, Milano 1967
- Guido Rosignoli, RSI - uniformi, equipaggiamento e armi - E. Albertelli edizioni, Parma 1985
- I. Montanelli - R. Gervaso, Storia d'Italia 1943-46, ed. Mondadori, Milano 1967
