= Squadrismo =

Movement of Italian fascist squads

Squadrismo (Italian: [skwaˈdrizmo]) was the movement of squadre d'azione (English: action squads), the fascist militias that were organised outside the authority of the Italian state and led by local leaders called ras (a noble Ethiopian title). The militia originally consisted of farmers and middle-class people, who created their own defence from revolutionary socialists. Squadrismo became an important asset for the rise of the National Fascist Party, led by Benito Mussolini, and systematically used violence to eliminate any political parties that were opposed to Italian fascism.

The violence was not only an instrument in politics but also a vital component of squadrismo identity, which made it difficult for the movement to be tamed. That was shown in the various attempts by Mussolini to control squadrismo violence with the Pact of Pacification and later the Consolidated Public Safety Act. Squadrismo, which ultimately became the Blackshirts, served as a source of inspiration for Adolf Hitler's Sturmabteilung.

== Origins ==
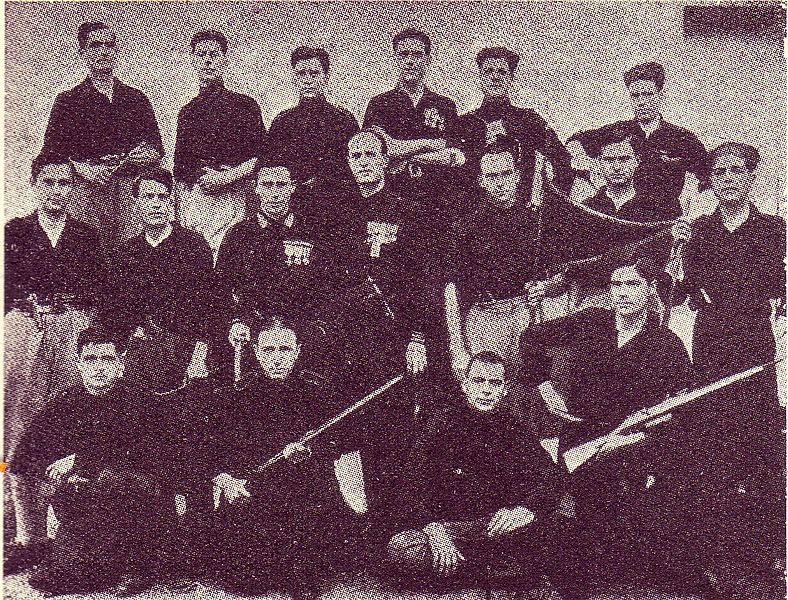
Squadra d'azione (action squad) La Disperata from Florence

After World War I, there was a general feeling of disillusionment. Diffused poverty, economic fractures and a social and moral political upheaval generated by the mobilisation of the war contributed to the unstable climate proceeding the armistice. That enabled an excess of violence to be present. Furthermore, (new) farmers were opposed to the new rural trade unions which wanted to control the agrarian economy. The middle class decided that it required to fend itself from the socialists because the government could not contain them. As a result, a series of middle-class defence leagues were formed. The first squadrismo was thus nationalist and founded on the traditions of the Fasci d'Azione Rivoluzionaria, a phenomenon of citizens.

In that context emerged the Fasci Italiani di Combattimento, founded on 23 March 1919 by Benito Mussolini during a meeting in the San Sepolcro Square, in Milan. Squadrismo was a movement that expanded instantly afterward, and by spring 1920, the fascists installed a political militia of squadre in various parts of Northern Italy, mostly in Trieste. Many of the squadristi (name given to individuals in the squadrismo movement) joined the Fasci Italiani di Combattimento, but some remained independent from Mussolini's control.

From then onward, various assaults by Trieste squads against Socialists took place. Thousands of squads formed "action squads" and spread terror throughout the countryside. The squads were groups of 30 to 50 that were often led by former army officers. In towns in which socialism was still strong, squadrismo was a tool of intimidation. It was so violent that some have described the events as a civil war. That profoundly decreased the Italian government's credibility, which was seen as incapable of keeping law and order.

The habitus of squadrismo was characterised by violence, and was used in a political way in which squadristi acted under the oversight of local leaders, also known as ras. Squadrismo had the protection from national and local leaders, which also legitimised and banalised its violence and enhanced the idea that there was no opposition possible to the new Fascist Party.

== Towards the March on Rome ==
At first, the movement had difficulty gaining power, but the fascists quickly drew attention through its ominous acts of violence. The movement grew exponentially from 1920 onwards with the Fasci di Combattimento, which launched assaults in Northern Italy in rural areas and contributed to the suppression of all other political and trade union organisations. Membership grew rapidly, and Mussolini soon declared war on socialist organisations, which led to "punitive expeditions" of squadre to the countryside to dismiss socialist headquarters and to fracture trade unions.

During the elections of 1921, the violence continued despite Mussolini's electoral success. There were 207 political killings occurred, and substantially more of the victims were socialists than fascists. Mussolini attempted to reduce the violence by the Pact of Pacification, but it soon became ineffective and was entirely ignored by squadristi. As a result of attempts to discipline them, Mussolini decided to use their violence to his advantage by converting the movement into an organised party by a national congress, which met in Rome from 7 to 10 November 1921. The new party was named Partito Nazionale Fascista and stood for order, discipline and hierarchy.

The March on Rome on 28 October 1922 further enhanced Mussolini's seizure of power, with thousands of squadristi marching through the Italian capital. King Victor Emmanuel III proceeded to appoint Mussolini to lead the new administration, but that did not stop squadrismo violence, and thousands of people in black shirts participated in squadrista militancy from 1920 to 1922.

After the March on Rome, fascism was torn between the state, which wanted to end all illegal violence, including squadrismo, and the fasci, including the squadre leaders, who were determined to maintain their power. To control the violence at last, Mussolini issued the Consolidated Public Safety Act in 1926, which delegitimised squadristi violence.

== Conflict with Mussolini ==
In an effort to end the escalating violence between the socialist and the Squadristi militias, Mussolini signed an interim Pact of Pacification on August 2 or 3, 1921 with the Italian Socialist Party (PSI) and General Confederation of Labour (CGL), which caused most ras in the northern provinces of Italy to denounce the peace pact. Mussolini had planned to assimilate the mostly-self-organising squadrismo into his movement, but the violence against socialists was compromising his strategy of not wanting to "lose his position on the left", which included the establishment of a Fascist Labor Party or National Labor Party.

A number of squadristi leaders voiced opposition to Mussolini's leadership and plastered posters in the city of Bologna that denounced "Mussolini as a traitor to Fascism". Some squadristi paramilitary units completely abandoned Mussolini's fascist movement. There were secret anti-Mussolini meetings that fixated on "Mussolini's lingering leftist loyalties", which included his leadership of the Italian Socialist Party (1912–1914) and his admiration for Vladimir Lenin. The historian Richard Pipes stated that during the turbulent times of infighting, "Mussolini would have been glad as late as 1920–21 to take under his wing the Italian Communists, for which he had great affinities".

Many prominent ras pushed for new leadership, lending their support to Gabriele D’Annunzio to "replace Mussolini". Grandi and Balbo sought an audience with the radical nationalist D’Annunzio in August 1921 and offered him a position to lead the squadristi in an "insurrectionary march on Rome". D’Annunzio was vague about in his reply. In September 1919, D’Annunzio and his force of 2,000 armed followers, primarily ex-soldiers, marched into Fiume and occupied it for fifteen months.

Mussolini went on the offensive and disparaged the squadrismo by declaring that provincial Fascism was "no longer liberation, but tyranny; no longer protector of the nation, but defense of private interests and of the dullest, deafest, most miserable caste that exists in Italy". In another terse response, Mussolini warned, "I shall defend this pact with all my strength, and if Fascism does not follow me in collaboration with the Socialists, at least no one can force me to follow Fascism".

== Victory over Mussolini ==
Mussolini was unable to gain significant control over the squadrismo to preserve his old alliance of national syndicalists, revolutionaries and Futurists. At the Third Fascist Congress in Rome from November 7 to 10, 1921, Mussolini was pressured into conceding to the majority delegation of squadristi leaders and members, abandoning his plans for a "Fascist Labor Party" and accepting the party as an "association of the fasci and their storm squads". In return for his concessions, Mussolini was recognised as the undisputed leader of the newly renamed National Fascist Party.

The action squads were to become identified by their black shirts, a motif that ultimately coined the name Blackshirts and became the inspiration for Adolf Hitler's SA during the Third Reich. Mussolini and his followers selected the iconic black shirts of labourers in the Italian cities of Romagna and Emilia who had originally "adopted their uniforms from the anarchists".

== See also ==
- Fascist syndicalism
