= Alessandro Pavolini =

Italian politician and writer (1903–1945)

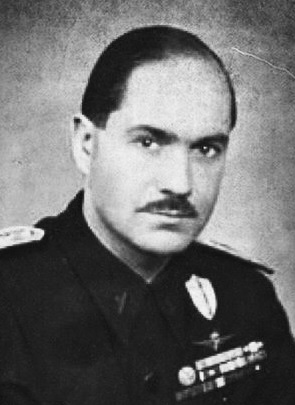
- Pavolini in 1930s

Secretary of the Republican Fascist Party
- In office 15 November 1943 – 28 April 1945
- Leader: Benito Mussolini
- Preceded by: Office established
- Succeeded by: Office abolished

Minister of Popular Culture
- In office 31 October 1939 – 6 February 1943
- Prime Minister: Benito Mussolini
- Preceded by: Dino Alfieri
- Succeeded by: Gaetano Polverelli

Member of the Chamber of Deputies / Chamber of Fasces and Corporations
- In office 28 April 1934 – 25 July 1943
- President: Giovanni Giuriati; Costanzo Ciano; Dino Grandi
- Constituency: Florence

Personal details
- Born: 27 September 1903 Florence, Kingdom of Italy
- Died: 28 April 1945 (aged 41) Dongo, Italian Social Republic
- Party: FIC (1920–1921); PNF (1921–1943); PFR (1943–1945)
- Height: 1.72 m (5 ft 8 in)
- Spouse: Teresa Franzi (m. 1929)
- Domestic partner: Doris Duranti (1940–1945)
- Children: Ferruccio (1930); Maria Vittoria (1931); Vanni (1938)
- Education: University of Florence, Sapienza University of Rome
- Profession: Lawyer, journalist

Military service
- Allegiance: Kingdom of Italy; Italian Social Republic
- Branch/service: Regia Aeronautica; Black Brigades
- Battles/wars: Second Italo-Ethiopian War; World War II (executed)
- Awards: Gold Medal of Military Valor; War Merit Cross

Alessandro Pavolini (27 September 1903 – 28 April 1945) was an Italian politician, journalist, and essayist. He was notable for his involvement in the Italian fascist government, during World War II, and, as the leader and founder of the Black Brigades, also for his cruelty against the opponents of fascism.

== Early life and career ==
A native of Florence, Pavolini was the son of Paolo Emilio Pavolini, a major scholar of Sanskrit and other Indo-European languages. A brilliant student, he earned a law degree at the University of Florence and a political science degree at La Sapienza in Rome, travelling to and from between the two cities. His brother was the writer Corrado Pavolini.

After joining Benito Mussolini's movement in Florence, he took part in several actions of the Blackshirts, and led a squad during the 1922 March on Rome – the moment when Fascism took over in Italy. Pavolini was assigned tasks in the cultural field (including youth programs launched by the fascists), while contributing to fascist publications such as Battaglie fasciste, Rivoluzione fascista, and Critica fascista. Thanks to his acquaintance with Florentine fascist leader Luigi Ridolfi Vay da Verrazzano, he broke into active politics, becoming Ridolfi's deputy in 1927. From 1929 to 1934, he was local leader of the National Fascist Party (PNF) in Florence, as well as editor of the fascist publication Il Bargello (named after a military rank of the Middle Ages), which urged all intellectuals to contribute; Pavolini aimed for an image of Fascism as cultural and aristocratic – he initiated a series of cultural events that survived both Fascism and his death, including the yearly costumed re-enactment of the Italian Renaissance-era sport Calcio Fiorentino, the Maggio Musicale Fiorentino music festival and the Ponte Vecchio Artisans' Exhibit. Between 1934 and 1942, he was a regular contributor to Corriere della Sera as a "special guest".

== Fascist leader ==
After becoming a member of the national PNF leadership in 1932, he moved on from local politics to become the president of the Fascist Confederation of Professionals and Artists, which propelled him to a leadership position in the Council of Corporations. He took part in the Second Italo-Abyssinian War as a lieutenant inspecting the squadron led by Galeazzo Ciano (a group nicknamed La Disperata), and as a correspondent for Corriere della Sera. On April 15, the plane carrying Pavolini flew over the city of Dessie, which had just been occupied by Eritrean Ascaris led by General Alessandro Pirzio Biroli. However, when one of the two engines also suffered damage, he was forced to make an emergency landing in enemy territory, they were recovered the following day. Throughout his political career, Pavolini published cultural and literary essays, such as Disperata ("The Desperate"; 1937) and Scomparsa d'Angela ("Angela's Disappearance"; 1940). In 1939, he was appointed by Mussolini Minister of Popular Culture, and served until January 1943.

In 1939, Pavolini was appointed as the Minister of Popular Culture (or "Minculpop" for short). Pavolini had an iron grip on what the press could or could not publish. The written instructions to the press (including radio broadcasts and "Luce" cinema newsreels) were dubbed veline (tissue paper) by the newsmen and covered a variety of domains (from forbidding to publish photos of boxer Primo Carnera knocked out and lying unconscious to the obligation of publishing flattering propaganda photos of Mussolini on a brand new Fiat tractor or forbidding to publish photos of Naples under the snow, fearing it would damage the tourism industry).

Minculpop also tackled the cinema industry (the famous and very creative Cinecitta studios in Rome were created by Mussolini's will to act as a counter against Hollywood productions; the Venice film festival is also a creation of the fascist period).

Pavolini was deeply involved in the cinema industry (either on the propaganda or on the entertainment sides of it) and famously had a much publicized affair with Doris Duranti, a film actress of the period who starred in the Telefoni Bianchi subgenre of light comedy films and prominently featured in the very first bare-bosomed scene in Italian cinema.

The Allied invasion of Sicily and the ousting of Mussolini in Rome brought Nazi intervention and the proclamation of a new fascist puppet state, the northern Italian Social Republic. Pavolini was integrated into the Republic's administration under Mussolini, and was immediately promoted head of the successor of the PNF, the Republican Fascist Party (PFR) (the only person to occupy that post); he took part in the drafting of major documents, including the Verona manifesto that called for the execution of former Grand Council of Fascism members who had voted against Mussolini in April.

== Black Brigades ==
The creation of the Black Brigades was a plan long pursued by Pavolini, who envisioned an intransigent, totalitarian, exclusive, and combative organization inspired by the old squadrismo action squads. The project met opposition from Rodolfo Graziani and Renato Ricci, who were against the creation of a politicized army. Pavolini argued that Italians disliked rigid military structures; in his view, the partisan movement succeeded because its fighters felt independent and acted according to their own initiative. He therefore proposed forming an anti-partisan force built on similar foundations. The idea was welcomed by the Germans, particularly Karl Wolff and Rudolf Rahn, who saw in it the possibility of creating, through the party's structures, a more agile and decisive force than the Republican National Guard, capable of suppressing partisan activity and securing the German rear as the Allies advanced toward the Gothic Line.

On 22 June 1944, Pavolini distributed weapons to members of the Republican Fascist Party (PFR) in Lucca, effectively establishing what became the first Black Brigade, named "Mussolini" and commanded by Idreno Utimperghe. The official formation of the Black Brigades was announced by Pavolini in a radio speech on 25 July 1944, the first anniversary of the Grand Council's vote against Mussolini. By 30 June 1944, forty-one provincial brigades had been established, each named after a fallen fascist, along with seven autonomous and eight mobile brigades, for a total strength officially claimed at around 110,000 personnel, though their effectiveness was limited by shortages of materiel and the inexperience of many party officials suddenly appointed as commanders. The brigades were intended to spearhead the "march of the Social Republic against the Vendée," particularly in Piedmont, where partisan forces had established significant control. During operations in the Orco Valley on 12 August 1944, Pavolini was wounded in a partisan attack and later awarded the Iron Cross on Wolff's proposal. He subsequently took part in the reconquest of the partisan Republic of Ossola in October 1944 and accompanied Mussolini during his last public appearance in Milan on 16 December 1944.

At the end of January 1945, Mussolini sent Pavolini to Venezia Giulia, where the Germans had established the Adriatic Coast Operational Zone in 1943, effectively removing the area from the authority of the Italian Social Republic. In Udine, Gorizia, Fiume, and Trieste, Pavolini met local fascist representatives and criticized German policies favoring Croatian elements. In Trieste he delivered a speech emphasizing the city's Italian identity. Pavolini was also a leading advocate of the Republican Alpine Redoubt (RAR), proposed in September 1944, which envisioned a final stand in Valtellina by remaining RSI forces, particularly the Black Brigades. Appointed president of the coordinating commission, he organized troop assignments and defensive plans, including fortifications and propaganda initiatives. In April 1945 he presented the project to Mussolini and senior RSI and German officials at Villa Feltrinelli, declaring that the "Thermopylae of fascism" would be fought in Valtellina. The plan, however, was never realized. As defeat loomed, Pavolini arranged financial assistance, escape options, and clandestine preparations for loyal fascists, including proposals for a secret headquarters in Switzerland funded with foreign currency reserves.

== Capture and death ==
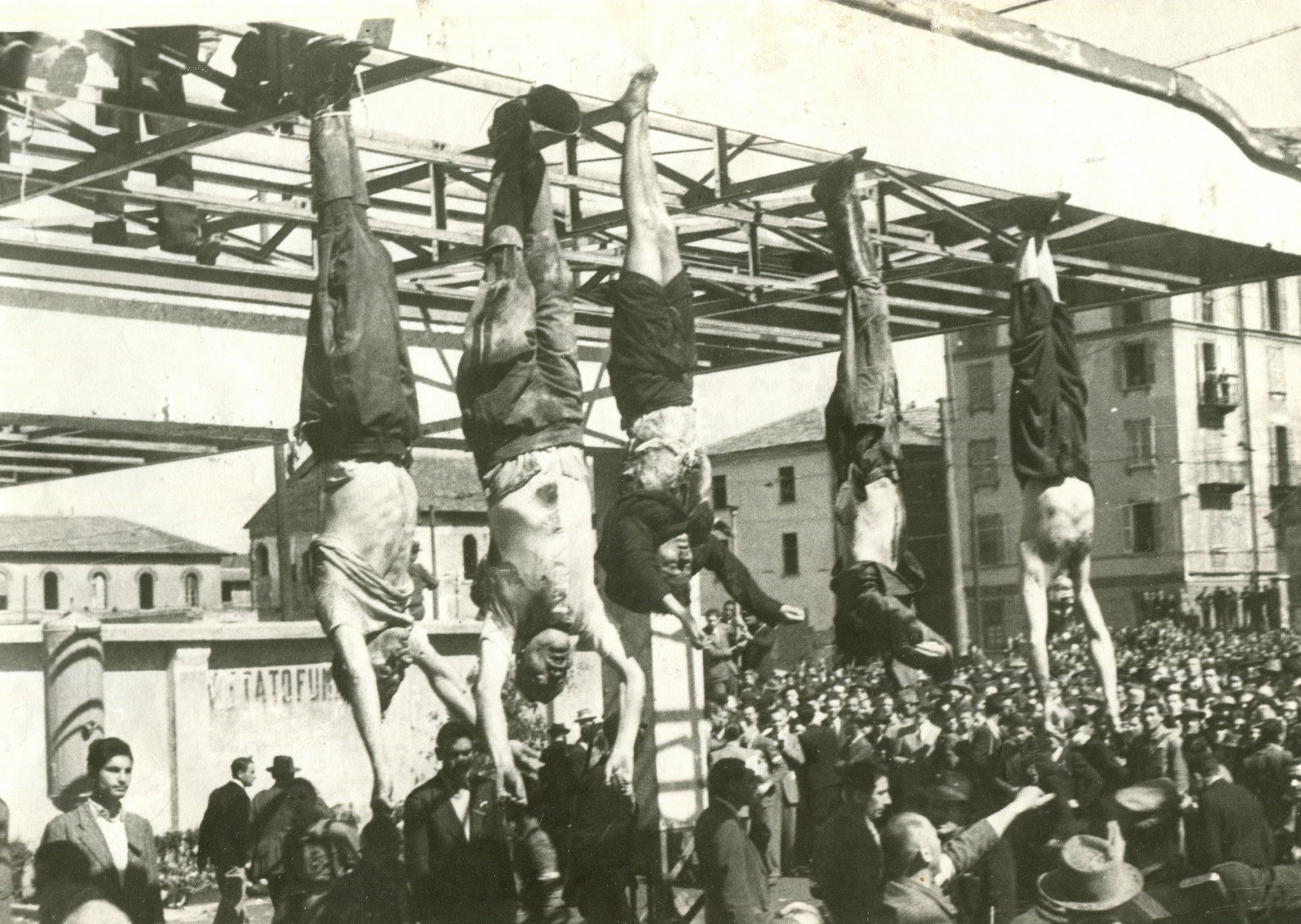
From left to right, the dead bodies of Bombacci, Mussolini, Petacci, Pavolini and Starace in Piazzale Loreto, 1945.

After the failure of surrender negotiations with the National Liberation Committee, Mussolini, following a meeting at the Prefecture building in Milan, accepted Pavolini's proposal to move toward the Republican Alpine Redoubt, disguising the order with the phrase “Precampa a Como.” Pavolini ordered the Black Brigades of Liguria and Piedmont to head for Valtellina, estimating their strength at around 25,000 men. Before departing, he clashed with Rodolfo Graziani, who accused him of lying and deceiving the Duce, and with Junio Valerio Borghese, who stated that the X Flottiglia would not go to Valtellina and would instead surrender "our way."

Upon Mussolini's departure, Pavolini urged Carlo Borsani, a blind war veteran and Gold Medal of Military Valor recipient, to remain in Milan. Mussolini left on the evening of 25 April. The following day, Pavolini, together with Idreno Utimperghe, commander of the Black Brigade of Lucca, led a column of 178 vehicles carrying 4,636 men and 346 auxiliaries. Reaching Como and not finding Mussolini, who had proceeded to Menaggio, Pavolini continued on 26 April towards Menaggio.

He joined Mussolini's convoy, which merged with a German column retreating north. Pavolini travelled in an armored car at the head of the procession. Near Dongo, the convoy encountered a roadblock set up by the 52nd Garibaldi Brigade under Count Pier Luigi Bellini delle Stelle. After negotiations, the partisans allowed the German vehicles to pass. Mussolini, disguised in a German non-commissioned officer's coat and helmet, attempted to avoid detection. Once the Germans had passed, the Italian vehicles were expected to turn back. However, Pavolini's truck suddenly accelerated in an awkward maneuver to cross a ditch, which was interpreted as an attempt to break through the blockade, triggering a firefight. While Francesco Maria Barracu proposed surrender, Pavolini shouted, "We must die like fascists, not like cowards," seized a machine gun, and ran toward the lake while firing. He was pursued and wounded by shrapnel.

Captured during the night and weakened by his wound, Pavolini was taken to Dongo, to the town hall's Golden Hall, where Mussolini had also been brought after being recognized and arrested. Along with Paolo Porta and Paolo Zerbino, Pavolini was tried for collaboration with the enemy and sentenced to immediate execution by the CLN under the ordinance of 12 April. He was shot in Dongo on 28 April 1945, together with Porta and Zerbino. The same day, twelve other detainees were executed. Pavolini's body was displayed the following day in Milan, in Piazzale Loreto, alongside Mussolini's.

Assembly seats
Preceded by —	Member of the Chamber of Deputies / Chamber of Fasces and Corporations for Florence; 28 April 1934 – 25 July 1943	Succeeded by —
Government offices
Preceded by Dino Alfieri	Minister of Popular Culture; 31 October 1939 – 6 February 1943	Succeeded by Gaetano Polverelli
Party political offices
New title Party founded	Secretary of the Republican Fascist Party; 15 November 1943 – 28 April 1945	Party dissolved
