= Republican Fascist Party =

Italian political party (1943–1945)

Republican Fascist Party Partito Fascista Repubblicano
- Abbreviation: PFR
- Duce: Benito Mussolini
- Secretary: Alessandro Pavolini
- Founded: 13 September 1943
- Dissolved: 2 May 1945 (Note: Banned on 22 December 1947)
- Preceded by: National Fascist Party
- Succeeded by: Italian Social Movement (de facto)
- Headquarters: Palazzo Castani, Milan
- Newspaper: Il Lavoro Fascista
- Paramilitary wing: Black Brigades (Note: 30 June 1944 – 25 April 1945)
- Membership: 900,000 (1943 est.)
- Ideology: Italian fascism Fascist republicanism Sansepolcrismo; Anti-monarchism; Pro-Nazism
- Political position: Far-right
- Colours: Black
- Anthem: "Giovinezza" (lit. 'Youth')

The Republican Fascist Party (Italian: Partito Fascista Repubblicano, PFR) was a far-right political party in Italy led by Benito Mussolini and the sole representative party of the Italian Social Republic (RSI) during the Nazi occupation of Northern Italy. The PFR was the successor to the National Fascist Party (PNF) but was more influenced by pre-1922 early radical fascism and anti-monarchism, as its members considered King Victor Emmanuel III to be a traitor after his agreement of the signing of the surrender to the Western Allies.

== History ==
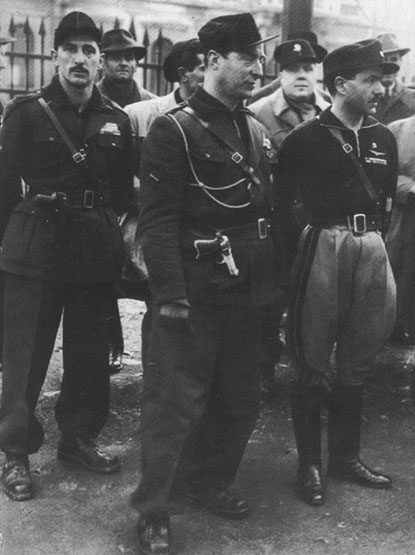
Alessandro Pavolini (right), National Secretary of the PFR and commander in chief of the Black Brigades, and Vincenzo Costa (centre), commander of the "Aldo Resega" Black Brigade, during a ceremony in Milan (late 1944)

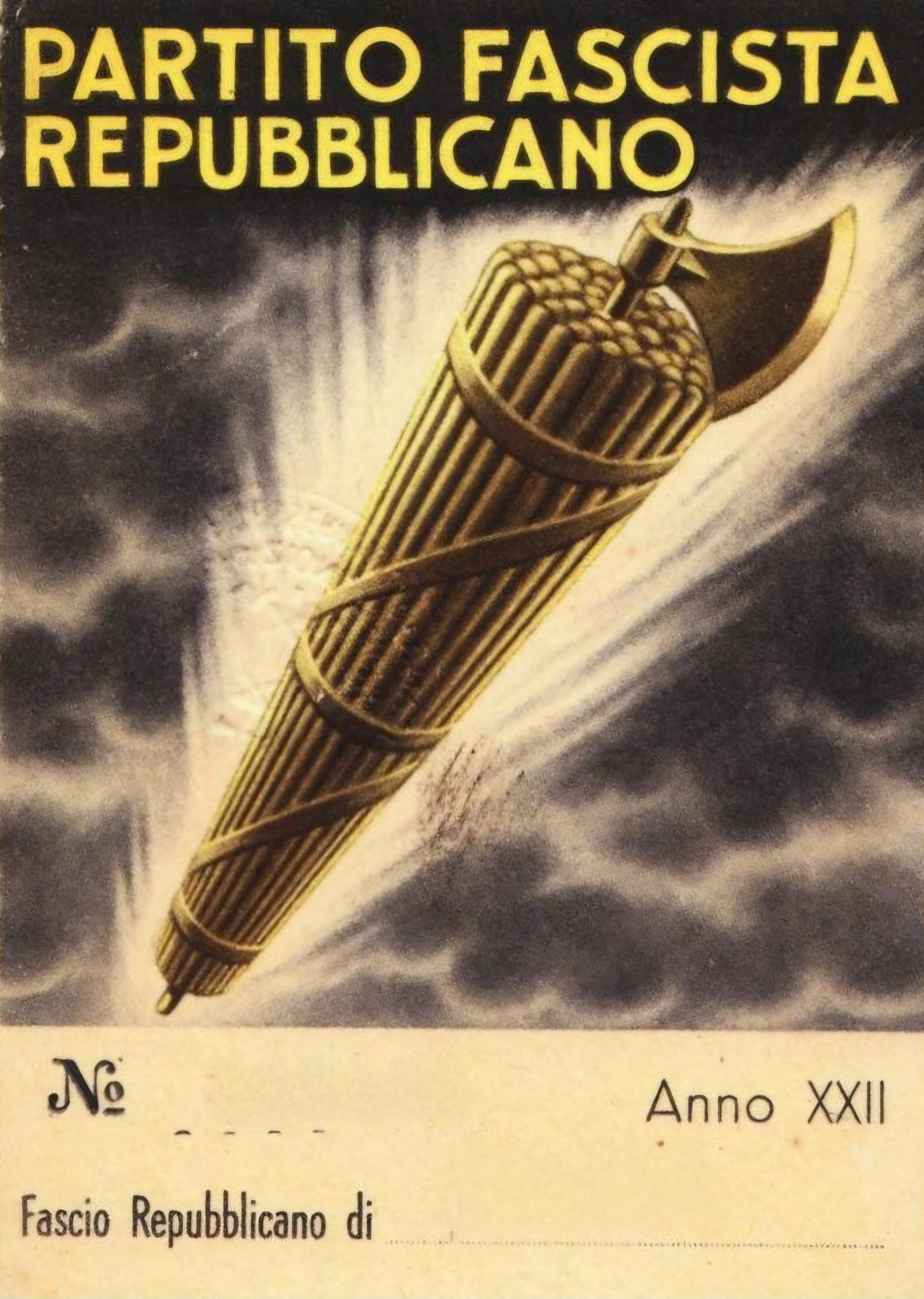
Membership card of the Republican Fascist Party

After the Nazi-engineered Gran Sasso raid liberated Mussolini, the National Fascist Party (PNF) was revived on 13 September 1943 as the Republican Fascist Party (PFR) and as the single party of the Northern and Nazi-protected Italian Social Republic (Italian: Repubblica Sociale Italiana, RSI), informally known as the "Republic of Salò" (Italian: Repubblica di Salò). Its National Secretary was the Fascist gerarca and former journalist Alessandro Pavolini from 15 November 1943 to 28 April 1945, while Giuseppe Pizzirani led the Republican Fascist Party in Rome until April 1944, when he was named Deputy Secretary of the party.

Due to the strong control of the Nazi Germans, the party's power in the context of the Republic of Salò was always very limited. To obviate this inherent weakness, the party tried to obtain the support of the few population strata who still sympathised with fascism. In the provinces under the control of the Germans it was organised into three entities called Administrative, Assistance, and Political. The Assistance, also called the National Fascist Assistance Body, was formed in early October 1943. In the minds of the party leaders, the Assistance was to be a continuation of the powerful cadres of militants and volunteers of the former National Fascist Party.

The PFR did not outlast Mussolini's execution and the defeat of the Italian Social Republic in April 1945. However, it inspired the creation of the Italian Social Movement (MSI) which came to be often seen as the successor to both the PFR and the PNF. The MSI was formed by former Fascist leaders and veterans of the National Republican Army of the Republic of Salò. The party tried to modernize and revise the Fascist doctrine into a more moderate and sophisticated direction.

== Ideology ==
The PFR sought to reconnect the new party with pre-1922 radical fascism. This move attracted parts of the fascist 'Old Guard', who had been sidelined after Mussolini had come to power in 1922. The new party was, however, internally divided, with different internal tendencies vying for Mussolini's support, and whilst the PFR revived some of the early revolutionary fascist discourse, it did not return to the anti-clerical positions of the early fascist movement.

In addition, the party promoted a revolutionary form of Italian nationalism, antisemitism, anti-liberalism, anti-communism, anti-capitalism, anti-monarchism, and republicanism. The RSI program, set out in the "Verona Manifesto" and approved by the congress of the Republican Fascist Party (Verona, 15–16 November 1943), revived the revolutionary formulas of early fascism and included, among other things, the abandonment of corporatism and the creation of a National Confederation of Labour, a broad program of social welfare and worker participation in company profits. The program, opposed by the Germans and by Italian industrialists, was not implemented while, starting with the strikes of March 1944, a growing workers' opposition to the RSI developed.

Throughout the party's brief existence, it fell under significant pressure from the German occupation forces to conform to Nazi policies.

=== Socialization ===
The doctrine of socialization was formally articulated during the Congress of Verona held on 14–15 November 1943, which presented the political and economic program of the newly constituted PFR. The Manifesto of Verona called upon the technical and labouring classes to cooperate in the management of enterprises and in the equitable distribution of profits (Article 12). This represented an evolution of the corporative system already proposed by Mussolini in his address to the National Assembly of Corporations on 23 March 1936:

This constitutional transformation of an important sector of our economy will be carried out calmly but decisively, in a Fascist manner... In this economy, workers shall become—with equal rights and equal duties—collaborators in the enterprise, alongside the providers of capital and technical directors.

The "socialization of the economy" was one of the three main pillars of Fascist economic doctrine, alongside corporatism and Italian: fiscalità monetaria (lit. 'monetary fiscality'), and was intended to provide the structural basis for the regime's concept of "organic democracy".

The economic policy of the Republican Fascist Party (PFR) represented an attempt to reassert the social and revolutionary character of early Fascism within the context of the Italian Social Republic (Italian: Repubblica Sociale Italiana, RSI). Central to this vision was the concept of the "socialization of the economy" (Italian: socializzazione dell’economia), which sought to reconcile capital and labour through corporative participation and the collective ownership of the means of production. The economic platform was codified in the Manifesto of Verona (November 1943) and later legislatively defined in the "Decree on the Socialization of Enterprises" of February 1944. These measures aimed to establish a "third way" between capitalism and Bolshevism, combining state intervention with worker participation, though they were only partially implemented and remained largely theoretical due to the constraints of war and German occupation.

==== Background ====
Within Fascist ideology, the phrase "socialization of the economy" referred to a theory of social transformation in which ownership of the means of production would no longer be the exclusive privilege of capitalists, but would be shared with workers employed in enterprises. The concept evolved from the corporatist economic system developed during the interwar years. It reflected the regime's aspiration to transcend both liberal capitalism and Marxist socialism through a system of "organic democracy" (Italian: democrazia organica).

The ideological foundations of Fascist socialization can be traced to earlier documents such as the Carta del Carnaro of 1920, the Carta del Lavoro of 1927, and Ugo Spirito's theory of the Italian: corporazione proprietaria (lit. 'proprietary corporation') developed in 1932, in which the corporation itself would become the owner of the enterprise, harmonizing the interests of capital and labor.

This principle was meant to establish a "third way" between the dominant economic systems of the twentieth century—capitalism and Bolshevism—both in their economic organization and their social implications. Among the leading proponents of this policy was Nicola Bombacci, a former communist and early associate of Mussolini, who sought to fuse elements of socialism, anarchism, and distributism with Fascist corporatism. Bombacci's influence drew from a variety of ideological sources, including the Ukrainian anarchist Nestor Makhno, Fabian socialism, and Silvio Gesell's theories of "free economy".

==== Implementation and legislative framework ====
Following the Verona Congress, Mussolini established the Ministry of Corporative Economy (Italian: Ministero dell'Economia Corporativa) on 23 September 1943, appointing first Silvio Gai and subsequently Angelo Tarchi as ministers. Tarchi accelerated the drafting of the decree on socialization, which culminated in the Decree on the Socialization of Enterprises (Italian: Decreto sulla socializzazione delle imprese), promulgated on 12 February 1944 (No. 375).

The decree, signed by Mussolini, Domenico Pellegrini Giampietro, and Piero Pisenti, defined the structure of socialized enterprises, establishing organs such as the "assembly", the "management council" (Italian: Consiglio di Gestione), the "board of auditors", and the "board of revisers". The decree applied to private enterprises that, as of 1 January 1944, had at least 1 million lire in capital or employed more than 100 workers. It provided for worker participation in the election of management councils, state oversight of key industries, and the redistribution of profits between employees and the newly created Institute of Management and Financing (Italian: Istituto di Gestione e Finanziamento).

The decree was divided into three titles comprising forty-six articles:

Section	Title	Articles
Title I	Of the Socialization of Enterprises	1–30
Section I	Administration of Socialized Enterprises	1–21
Section II	Liability of the Head of Enterprise and Administrators	22–30
Title II	On the Transfer of State-Owned Enterprises	31–43
Title III	Determination and Distribution of Profits	44–46

Despite its ideological ambition, the decree was implemented only sporadically. German authorities and Italian industrial elites viewed the policy with suspicion, fearing it would disrupt wartime production. Consequently, few enterprises adopted the system in practice. A report dated 20 June 1944 by Anselmo Vaccari, head of the Fascist Federation of Commercial Employees, admitted that workers regarded the decree "as a decoy for larks" and that "the masses hold aloof from us and from the mirror."

Following Mussolini's "Speech of the Resurgence" (Italian: discorso della riscossa) in December 1944, the Raggruppamento Nazionale Repubblicano Socialista (transl. National Republican Socialist Group) was formed under Edmondo Cione, making the socialization of enterprises the core of its political program. Full implementation of the policy was scheduled for 25 April 1945, but the fall of the RSI and the advance of the Allied and partisan forces prevented its realization. The first administrative act of the Comitato di Liberazione Nazionale (CLN) after the liberation of northern Italy was the abrogation of the decree, denouncing it as an attempt "to yoke the Italian working masses to collaboration with the invader."

==== Reception and legacy ====
The economic socialization project represented the culmination of Fascism's long-standing effort to present itself as a revolutionary, socially integrative movement. Although it was largely unimplemented, its ideological and symbolic value persisted among the post-war neo-fascist movements, particularly within the Italian Social Movement (MSI), which regarded it as evidence of the PFR's commitment to a "social" variant of Fascism.

Historians have variously interpreted the initiative as a propaganda instrument, a sincere attempt to reform economic relations, or a desperate bid to regain popular legitimacy during the RSI's terminal phase. Scholars such as Giorgio Bocca, Paolo Buchignani, and Arrigo Petacco emphasize that, despite its utopian rhetoric, the policy failed to reconcile its corporatist structure with the realities of a wartime command economy. The "socialization of the economy" remains one of the most distinctive yet controversial features of Fascist economic thought, illustrating the regime's attempt to construct an alternative to both capitalist and socialist paradigms.

== Secretary of the PFR ==
- Alessandro Pavolini (15 November 1943 – 28 April 1945)

== National Congress ==
- 1st National Congress – Verona, 14–15 November 1943

== Bibliography ==
- E. Amicucci, I 600 giorni di Mussolini, Faro, Roma, 1948.
- Giorgio Bocca, Mussolini socialfascista, Milano, Garzanti, 1983.
- Paolo Buchignani, Fascisti rossi, Mondadori, 1998.
- Arrigo Petacco, Il comunista in camicia nera, Nicola Bombacci tra Lenin e Mussolini, Mondadori, 1997.
- Claudio Schwarzenberg, Il sindacalismo fascista, Mursia, 1972.
- Verbali del Consiglio dei Ministri della Repubblica Sociale Italiana – settembre 1943 – aprile 1945 (edited by Francesca Romana Scardaccione, Ministry of Cultural Heritage, 2002).
- Edmondo Cione, Storia della Repubblica Sociale Italiana, Caserta, Il Cenacolo, 1948; reprinted Rome: Latinitas, 1951.
