= List of commanding generals of the Carabinieri =

Commanding General of the Carabinieri
- Comandante generale dell'Arma dei Carabinieri
- Coat of arms of the Carabinieri

- Flag of the commanding general of the Carabinieri

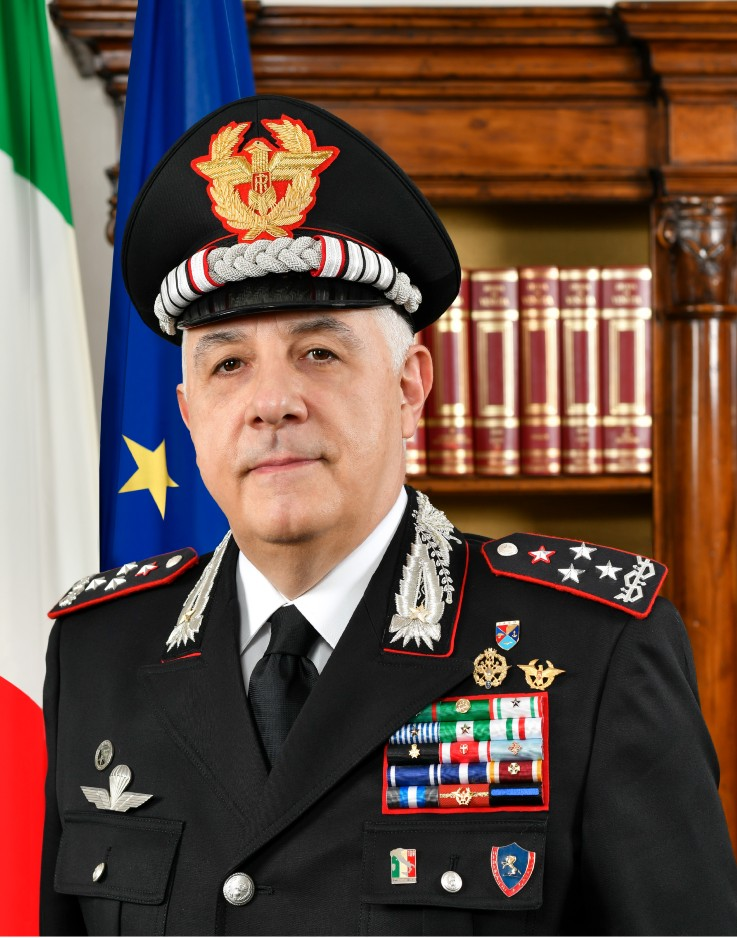
- Incumbent; Army corps general Teo Luzi since 16 January 2021
- Ministry of Defence; Carabinieri
- Reports to: The minister of defence
- Seat: Rome, Italy
- Nominator: The minister of defence
- Appointer: The president of Italy
- Formation: 3 August 1814
- First holder: Giuseppe Thaon di Revel di Sant'Andrea
- Deputy: Army corps general Enzo Bernardini
- Website: Carabinieri website

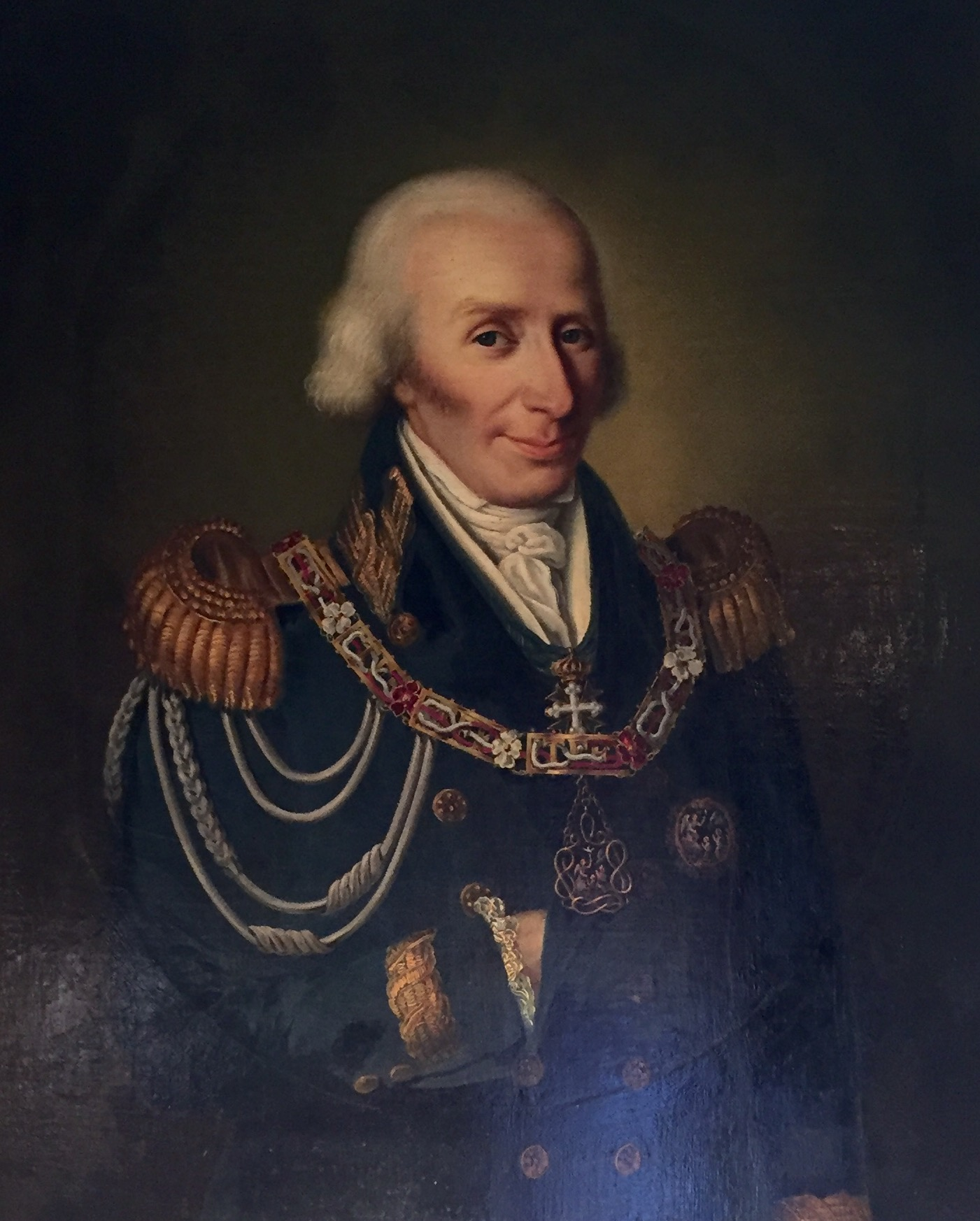
Army general Giuseppe Thaon di Revel di Sant'Andrea, first Commanding General of the Carabinieri (1814).

This article lists the commanding generals of the Carabinieri, the national gendarmerie and a law enforcement agency of Italy.

== List ==
No.	Rank	Name	Appointed	Dismissed
1	Army general	Giuseppe Thaon di Revel di Sant'Andrea	3 August 1814	23 December 1814
2	Lieutenant general	Giorgio des Geneys	24 December 1814	13 January 1815
3	Colonel	Carlo Lodi di Capriglio	14 January 1815	15 October 1816
4	Colonel	Giovanni Battista D'Oncieu de La Bàtie	1 November 1816	19 March 1819
5	Colonel	Alessandro Di Saluzzo di Monesiglio	23 March 1819	27 November 1820
6	Colonel	Giovanni Maria Cavasanti	2 December 1820	31 October 1822
7	Major general	Giovanni Battista D'Oncieu de La Bàtie	1 November 1822	11 December 1830
8	Major general	Giovanni Maria Cavasanti	12 December 1830	11 January 1831
9	Major general	Luigi Maria Richieri di Montichieri	12 January 1831	2 July 1835
10	Major general	Michele Taffini D'Acceglio	16 July 1835	11 December 1847
11	Major general	Fabrizio Lazari	1 January 1848	13 October 1848
12	Major general	Federico Costanzo Lovera di Maria	14 October 1848	1 July 1867
13	Lieutenant general	Antonio Massidda	11 August 1867	16 July 1869
14	Lieutenant general	Luigi Incisa Beccaria di Santo Stefano	17 July 1869	17 May 1877
15	Lieutenant general	Ignazio De Genova di Pettinengo	18 May 1877	3 November 1877
16	Lieutenant general	Leonardo Roissard de Bellet	5 October 1878	16 April 1891
17	Lieutenant general	Luigi Taffini D'Acceglio	17 April 1891	15 September 1896
18	Lieutenant general	Francesco Carenzi	16 September 1896	22 June 1897
19	Lieutenant general	Bruto Bruti	16 July 1897	15 February 1900
20	Lieutenant general	Felice Sismondo	16 February 1900	15 April 1904
21	Lieutenant general	Federigo Pizzuti	16 April 1904	24 July 1905
22	Lieutenant general	Giuseppe Bellati	5 August 1905	15 February 1908
23	Lieutenant general	Paolo Spingardi	16 February 1908	30 April 1909
24	Lieutenant general	Giuseppe Del Rosso	1 August 1909	13 September 1914
25	Lieutenant general	Gaetano Zoppi	14 September 1914	3 January 1918
26	Lieutenant general	Luigi Cauvin	4 January 1918	24 August 1919
27	Lieutenant general	Carlo Petitti di Roreto	25 August 1919	29 October 1921
28	Army corps general	Giacomo Ponzio (Note: Served at the time of the March on Rome (28–29 October 1922), the Fascist takeover of the Kingdom of Italy and the establishment of the Fascist regime.)	23 November 1921	4 January 1925
29	Army corps general	Enrico Asinari di San Marzano	5 January 1925	27 November 1935
30	Army corps general	Riccardo Moizo	30 November 1935	24 August 1940
31	Army corps general	Remo Gambelli	27 August 1940	22 February 1943
32	Army corps general	Azolino Hazon	23 February 1943	19 July 1943
33	Army corps general	Angelo Cerica (Note: Served at the time of the fall of the Fascist regime, arrest of Benito Mussolini (25 July 1943) and the Armistice of Cassibile (3/8 September 1943).)	23 July 1943	11 September 1943
34	Divisional general	Giuseppe Pièche	19 November 1943	20 July 1944
35	Army corps general	Taddeo Orlando	21 July 1944	6 March 1945
36	Divisional general	Brunetto Brunetti	7 March 1945	5 April 1947
37	Army corps general	Fedele de Giorgis	16 May 1947	24 May 1950
38	Army corps general	Alberto Mannerini	25 May 1950	4 May 1954
39	Army corps general	Luigi Morosini	5 May 1954	14 October 1958
40	Army corps general	Luigi Lombardi	15 October 1958	28 February 1961
41	Army corps general	Renato De Francesco	1 March 1961	14 October 1962
42	Army corps general	Giovanni de Lorenzo	15 October 1962	31 January 1966
43	Army corps general	Carlo Ciglieri	1 February 1966	25 February 1968
44	Army corps general	Luigi Fiorlenza	26 February 1968	2 January 1971
45	Army corps general	Corrado San Giorgio	3 January 1971	7 February 1973
46	Army corps general	Enrico Mino	8 February 1973	31 October 1977
47	Army corps general	Pietro Corsini	5 November 1977	31 January 1980
48	Army corps general	Umberto Cappuzzo	1 February 1980	13 September 1981
49	Army corps general	Lorenzo Valditara	14 September 1981	19 January 1984
50	Army corps general	Riccardo Bisogniero	20 January 1984	7 January 1986
51	Army corps general	Roberto Jucci	8 January 1986	20 April 1989
52	Army corps general	Antonio Viesti	21 April 1989	8 March 1993
53	Army corps general	Luigi Federici	9 March 1993	20 February 1997
54	Army corps general	Sergio Siracusa	21 February 1997	17 April 2002
55	Army corps general	Guido Bellini	18 April 2002	5 May 2004
56	Army corps general	Luciano Gottardo	6 May 2004	5 July 2006
57	Army corps general	Gianfranco Siazzu	6 July 2006	22 July 2009
58	Army corps general	Leonardo Gallitelli	23 July 2009	15 January 2015
59	Army corps general	Tullio Del Sette	16 January 2015	15 January 2018
60	Army corps general	Giovanni Nistri	16 January 2018	15 January 2021
61	Army corps general	Teo Luzi	16 January 2021	Incumbent

== See also ==
- Commander-General of the Carabinieri
- List of chiefs of the Polizia di Stato
