= Giovanni Frignani =

Italian soldier and Resistance member

- Born: 8 April 1897; Ravenna, Kingdom of Italy
- Died: 24 March 1944 (aged 46); Rome, Italian Social Republic
- Military career
- Allegiance: Kingdom of Italy
- Branch: Royal Italian Army
- Rank: Lieutenant Colonel
- Conflicts: World War I; Second Battle of the Piave River; World War II
- Awards: Gold Medal of Military Valour (posthumous); Bronze Medal of Military Valor

Giovanni Frignani (8 April 1897 – 24 March 1944) was an Italian soldier and Resistance member, most notable for his role in the arrest of Benito Mussolini after his dismissal as Prime Minister of Italy on 25 July 1943, in the arrest and death of Ettore Muti, and in the Roman Resistance after the Armistice of Cassibile.

== Biography ==
He was born in Ravenna on April 8, 1897, the son of Angelo Frignani and Gemma Salini. With the entry of the Kingdom of Italy into World War I, on 24 May 1915, he volunteered in the Royal Italian Army, joining the 52nd Battalion of the National Corps of Volunteer Cyclists. On the following year he was admitted to the officer cadet course at the Royal Military Academy of Modena, graduating with the rank of second lieutenant and being assigned to the 28th Infantry Regiment of the Pavia Infantry Brigade. After promotion to lieutenant, in June 1918 he distinguished himself in the Second Battle of the Piave River, earning a Bronze Medal of Military Valor. After the Armistice of Villa Giusti, he was made commander of garrison of Dambel.

In November 1919 he was transferred to the Carabinieri, serving as commander of the Carabinieri stations of Parma and Medicina; in 1929 he was promoted to captain and transferred to Rome, where he was assigned to the Servizio Informazioni Militare until 1934, carrying out intelligence operations. He was later promoted to major and appointed head of the intelligence service of the Army Corps; then commander of the Carabinieri Company that guarded the tribunals in Rome, and finally of the Internal Carabinieri Group of Rome. In this capacity, during the late 1930s and early 1940s he gathered information about the political and social situation in the capital, which he passed on to his superior Riccardo Moizo, who in turn related to the king and government. In 1942 he was promoted to lieutenant colonel, carrying out important counterintelligence tasks. In June 1943 he informed Mussolini that he had come into possession of a secret German document which showed that Hitler considered Italy to be an occupation zone; Mussolini ordered his transfer to France, which however did not take place due to delaying action by General Azolino Hazon, the commander-general of the Carabinieri. In the summer of 1943 Frignani was in command of the Carabinieri of Rome, and on 25 July, after the vote of no confidence against Mussolini by the Grand Council of Fascism, he oversaw the arrest of Mussolini, on the orders of King Victor Emmanuel III.

Less than a month later, on 23 August 1943, Frignani was ordered to arrest Fascist leader Ettore Muti, suspected of being preparing an insurrection to return Mussolini to power, at his villa in Fregene. The arrest was carried out in the night between 23 and 24 August by a squad of a dozen Carabinieri, led by Lieutenant Ezio Taddei; shortly after being arrested, however, Muti was killed in mysterious circumstances, supposedly during an escape attempt. Some historians believe that Muti was deliberately executed on the orders of the new head of government, Marshal of Italy Pietro Badoglio; others have pointed to a possible involvement of Frignani's brother Giuseppe, member of the Italian Parliament, former State Undersecretary for Finance and former Federal Secretary of the Fascist Party for Ravenna, and longtime enemy of Muti (the two had been bitter rivals for the leadership of the Ravenna section of the National Fascist Party in the 1920s).

After the armistice of Cassibile and the German occupation of Rome, Frignani went into hiding and devoted himself to the organization of the Clandestine Resistance Front of the Carabinieri, under the leadership of General Filippo Caruso and in liaison with Colonel Giuseppe Cordero Lanza di Montezemolo of the Clandestine Military Front. On 23 January 1944 he was arrested by the German police, together with Major Ugo de Carolis and Captain Raffaele Aversa, and imprisoned in the SS prison in via Tasso. He was locked up in the same cell as General Sabato Martelli Castaldi of the Regia Aeronautica, also a member of the Resistance; during the following two months he was tortured for information by the SS, and his wife Lina was also arrested and taken to via Tasso, where she was repeatedly forced to witness her husband's torture. On March 24, 1944, Frignani was executed along with more than three hundred political prisoners in the Fosse Ardeatine massacre. In his last letter written before execution, he had written: "I served my unfortunate Fatherland like a good soldier, and I only hope in the justice of God, not that of men". He was posthumously awarded the Gold Medal of Military Valor.
