= Giuseppe Pièche =

- Born: 7 March 1886; Florence, Kingdom of Italy
- Died: 25 August 1977 (aged 91); Velletri, Italy
- Military career
- Allegiance: Kingdom of Italy; Italy
- Branch: Royal Italian Army
- Rank: Lieutenant General
- Commands: Carabinieri Legion of Palermo; 3rd Carabinieri Brigade; 5th Carabinieri Brigade; 3rd Carabinieri Division "Ogaden"; Commander-General of the Carabinieri
- Conflicts: World War I; Pacification of Libya; Spanish Civil War; World War II; Italian occupation of Yugoslavia
- Awards: War Cross for Military Valor; War Merit Cross (twice); Order of the Crown of Italy; Colonial Order of the Star of Italy; Order of Saints Maurice and Lazarus

Giuseppe Pièche (Florence, 7 March 1886 – Velletri, 25 August 1977) was an Italian general during World War II. He spent most of his career in the Carabinieri, of which he was Commander-General from November 1943 to July 1944. After the war, he played an important role in setting up anti-Communist networks in Italy in the early stages of the Cold War.

== Biography ==
After entering the Military Academy of Modena in 1905, Pièche was appointed second lieutenant of the Royal Italian Army in 1907, assigned to the 71st Infantry Regiment and later (from 1908) to the 38th Infantry Regiment. In 1913 he was transferred to the Carabinieri, assigned to the Legion of Rome and later participating in the First World War, during which he was promoted to captain; at the end of the war he was in command of the Carabinieri detachment that guarded the headquarters of the Italian Supreme Command in Villa Giusti, near Padua, and in this capacity he witnessed the talks that led to the Armistice of Villa Giusti, as well as its signing. After serving in the Carabinieri Legions of Rome and of Bologna and being promoted to major, during the 1920s he was sent to Tripolitania, being promoted to lieutenant colonel in 1927. From 1932 to 1935 he was head of the III (counter-espionage) Section of the Servizio Informazioni Militare, and in 1935 he was promoted to colonel for exceptional merits and given command of the Carabinieri Legion of Palermo. In 1936, at the request of General Mario Roatta (commander of the Corps of Volunteer Troops), Pièche was given command of the Carabinieri detachment of the CTV (three sections and a company, numbering some 500 men overall) and entrusted with coordinating all military aid reaching the Nationalist camp. In 1938 he was promoted to brigadier general for special merits and placed in command of the 3rd Carabinieri Brigade (later passing to the command of the 5th Carabinieri Brigade); on 11 November 1940 he was promoted to the rank of major general and given command of the 3rd Carabinieri Division "Ogaden" of Naples.

After collaborating with the OVRA, in 1942 Pièche carried out an investigation on the proliferation of "parallel" police forces under the orders of the various Fascist leaders, on behalf of Benito Mussolini. From July 1942 to February 1943 he coordinated and directed military police operations in Croatia, serving again under Roatta, now in command of the 2nd Army. During this period he also headed an Italian military mission in the Independent State of Croatia and served as a consultant for the organization of the political police of Ante Pavelić; at the same time, however, he opposed the genocide of the local Jewish communities by the Ustashe. On November 4, 1942, he warned Mussolini of the use of gas to exterminate entire Jewish communities deported from the Balkans.

After returning to Italy, on 23 February 1943 he was appointed deputy general commander of the Carabinieri, and from 22 July he briefly held the prefecture of Foggia. He remained in territory controlled by the royalist government after the Armistice of Cassibile of September 1943, and on 19 December of the same year the head of government, Marshal of Italy Pietro Badoglio, appointed him Commander-General of the Carabinieri (with headquarters in Bari), a post he held until July 20, 1944, when he was made Prefect regent of the newly liberated province of Ancona and replaced by General Taddeo Orlando as Commander-General of the Carabinieri. While he was prefect of Ancona, the High Commissioner for Sanctions Against Fascism referred him to the Epuration Commission, which however declared nonsuit. On April 29, 1945, he was discharged from the Army.

After the end of the war in Europe, Pièche was prefect of Ancona until September 1945, and in 1946 he was appointed Director General of Civil Protection and Fire Services of the Ministry of the Interior. During this assignment, he continued in his counter-espionage activity, in a period of inactivity of the Italian secret services, as a consultant to the Confidential Affairs Office. In 1947 he allowed a series of meetings of the newly formed Italian Social Movement to be held at the Roman headquarters of the Vigili del Fuoco, and in 1948 he supported the birth of armed groups such as the Anti-Communist Movement for Italian Reconstruction (MACRI, ostensibly a Catholic assistance foundation), the Anti-Bolshevik Front and the Italian Liberation Army (AIL), composed of veterans of the Italian Social Republic, monarchist volunteers (Pièche himself was a staunch monarchist, being appointed baron on October 14, 1969 by the former king Umberto II) and other anti-communists. In the same period he directed the removal of former partisans from the police and the readmission of elements with a Fascist past. Informants were infiltrated into various leftist groups, and information was gathered on personalities linked to opposition parties. The AIL was particularly active in importing weapons through Bolzano and distributing them to cells throughout Italy; the suicide of an AIL officer, however, led to the discovery of the network and its demobilization. During the postwar period Pièche maintained relations with the main Western secret services, especially the American and British ones.

In 1970 he fled to Malta to escape an arrest warrant for his involvement in the failed coup of Junio Valerio Borghese. He was later exonerated and was able to return to Italy, where he died in 1977.

Military offices
Preceded by Angelo Cerica	Commander-in-Chief of the Carabinieri Corps; 19 November 1943 - 20 July 1944	Succeeded by Taddeo Orlando
