= Raffaele Aversa =

Italian officer and partisan

- Born: 2 December 1906; Labico, Kingdom of Italy
- Died: 24 March 1944 (aged 37); Rome, Italian Social Republic
- Military career
- Allegiance: Kingdom of Italy
- Branch: Royal Italian Army
- Rank: Captain
- Conflicts: Second Italo-Ethiopian War; World War II; Italian participation in the Eastern Front
- Awards: Gold Medal of Military Valour (posthumous); War Cross for Military Valor

Raffaele Aversa (2 September 1906 – 24 March 1944) was an Italian soldier and Resistance member, most notable for having carried out the arrest of Benito Mussolini after his dismissal as Prime Minister of Italy on 25 July 1943.

== Biography ==
Aversa was born in Labico on 2 September 1906, the son of Alfonso Aversa, commander of the local Carabinieri station, and Mariolina Aquino. After attending the "Pietro Colletta" Lyceum of Avellino, in December 1924 he enlisted in the Carabinieri, attending the Carabinieri School of Rome, and then serving as a non-commissioned officer in Florence. In October 1930 he enrolled in the Royal Military Academy of Modena to attend a special course, at the end of which he was commissioned with the rank of second lieutenant of the Carabinieri, on 1 March 1932. He was later promoted to lieutenant and in 1935 he was sent to East Africa, where he fought in the Second Italo-Ethiopian War. Assigned to the 390th Mobilized Carabinieri Section, he remained in Italian East Africa from 23 August 1935 to 29 May 1937.

In 1941, during the Second World War, he was promoted to captain. In March 1942 he was sent to the Eastern Front, attached to the 3rd Bersaglieri Regiment which was part of the 3rd Cavalry Division Principe Amedeo Duca d'Aosta of the CSIR; he was subsequently awarded a War Cross of Military Valor. In March 1943 he returned to Italy to take command of the "Compagnia Tribunali" of the Carabinieri of Rome.

After the fall of the Fascist regime, on 25 July 1943, together with Captain Paolo Vigneri, Aversa arrested Benito Mussolini, acting on the orders of Lieutenant Colonel Giovanni Frignani.

Following the Armistice of Cassibile and the German occupation of Rome, while Vigneri went into hiding, Aversa remained at his post, lamenting to Major Romolo Guercio that "they all fled: the troops who were defending Rome, the military leaders, the political authorities, etc. Only us carabinieri are left, [we are] the only ones who can still curb German excesses. Even if we have received specific orders, our duty is to protect the population. For this reason none of us must abandon his post. For me, if they think that what I have done is a crime, let them arrest and kill me, but I do not mean to hide, but rather I must and I want to operate openly and in full uniform, so that all my subordinates will only think of their duty, whatever is the cost".

On 7 October 1943, however, Aversa was forced to go into hiding after the new Fascist authorities attempted to have him arrested. He then devoted himself to organizing the Clandestine Resistance Front of the Carabinieri, under the leadership of General Filippo Caruso and in liaison with Colonel Giuseppe Cordero Lanza di Montezemolo of the Clandestine Military Front.

On 23 January 1944 he was arrested by the German police, together with Lieutenant Colonel Frignani and Major Ugo de Carolis. Imprisoned in the SS prison of Via Tasso, he was tortured for two months for information about the Resistance, but did not talk, and on 23 March 1944 he was shot in the Fosse Ardeatine massacre. He was posthumously awarded the Gold Medal of Military Valour.
