= Alberto Mannerini =

Italian general

- Born: 22 February 1891; Naples, Kingdom of Italy
- Died: 7 February 1962 (aged 70); Rome, Italy
- Military career
- Allegiance: Kingdom of Italy; Italy
- Branch: Royal Italian Army; Italian Army
- Rank: Lieutenant General
- Commands: "Monte Pelmo" Alpini Battalion; Pieve di Cadore" Alpini Battalion; 2nd Regiment "Granatieri di Sardegna"; Libyan Sahara Defense Command "Mannerini" Saharan Group; Commander-General of the Carabinieri
- Conflicts: First Italo-Senussi War; World War I; Battle of Asiago; Battle of Mount Ortigara; Third Battle of Monte Grappa; Italian invasion of Albania; World War II; Greco-Italian War; Italian occupation of Slovenia; Western Desert campaign; Operation Crusader; Tunisian campaign; Battle of the Mareth Line
- Awards: Silver Medal of Military Valor (three times); Bronze Medal of Military Valor (twice); War Cross for Military Valor; Military Order of Savoy; Order of the Crown of Italy; Order of Merit of the Italian Republic

Alberto Mannerini (Naples, 22 February 1891 – Rome, 7 February 1962) was an Italian general during World War II. After the war he served as Commander-General of the Carabinieri from 1950 to 1954.

== Biography ==
He was born in Naples on February 22, 1891, the son of Giovanni Mannerini and Santa Pigliacelli. On 7 November 1909 he entered the Royal Military Academy of Infantry and Cavalry of Modena, graduating on 23 February 1913 as second lieutenant, assigned to the 6th Alpini Regiment. He was immediately sent to Libya, where he participated in operations against the Senussi insurgency in 1913-1914.

During the course of the First World War, he held various commands within the 7th Alpini Regiment, being promoted to lieutenant and later to captain. In June 1916 he captured Cima Caldiera from the Austro-Hungarians on the Asiago plateau, for which he was awarded a Silver Medal of Military Valor, and a year later he participated in the battle of the Ortigara. Between 1917 and 1918 he commanded the "Monte Pelmo" Alpini Battalion, participating in the battle of Vittorio Veneto, and by the end of the war he had been awarded two silver medals, a bronze medal and a war cross for military valor.

After promotion to major he held the command of the "Pieve di Cadore" Alpini Battalion, as well as several roles as staff officer. He was promoted to lieutenant colonel on 1 December 1926 and given command of the 2nd Battalion of the 3rd Grenadiers of Sardinia Regiment, after which he held various posts, including that of Military Attaché in Turkey, until 18 October 1936, when he returned to Rome to assume the post of commander of the 2nd Grenadiers Regiment. On 31 December of the same year he was promoted to colonel, and held the command of the 2nd Grenadiers of Sardinia Regiment until February 14, 1939, when he was transferred to the headquarters of the VIII Army Corps of Rome, then under the command of General Remo Gambelli, for special assignments.

On 8 April 1939 he was flown to Tirana at the head of an ad-hoc, regiment-sized unit of the Grenadiers of Sardinia, named after him, in order to participate in the conquest of Albania, for which he was awarded another bronze medal for Military Valor. Returning to Rome, after the Kingdom of Italy entered the Second World War on 10 June 1940, he was Chief of Staff of the VIII Corps during the Greek campaign from December of the same year, being promoted to brigadier general for war merits on 11 June 1941. Immediately afterwards he became deputy commander of the 21st Infantry Division "Granatieri di Sardegna" (General Taddeo Orlando), sent to Slovenia (where it was stationed between Ljubljana and Kočevje) to garrison the province of Ljubljana and counter partisan activity in the area), but his stay was cut short as from 11 August 1941, on request of general Gastone Gambara (who had been his superior in Greece), he was assigned to the Armed Forces High Command in North Africa, for special assignments.

On 7 October 1942 he was given command of the Libyan Sahara Defense Command, which included all the desert garrisons in southern Libya and the "Auto-Saharan companies" which clashed with the Long Range Desert Group and the Free French of General Philippe Leclerc. In early 1943 he raised a division-sized "Saharan group" named after him (Raggruppamento Sahariano "Mannerini"), composed of the remnants of units that had been destroyed during the retreat from Libya (some 6,000 men, including the seven surviving Saharan companies, GAF troops, PAI personnel, colonial troops and cavalry units), which fought under his command during the Tunisian campaign, in the battle of the Mareth Line and in further clashes with the Long Range Desert Group. He was captured near Gabes on 29 March 1943 and remained in Allied captivity until 1945; upon returning to Italy, on 14 June 1945, he was awarded the Officer's Cross of the Military Order of Savoy.

He then held various positions within the Ministry of Defense, being promoted to major general on March 29, 1948, and appointed Deputy Chief of Staff of the Army in the following June. On 9 May 1950 he was promoted to lieutenant general, and from the following 25 May and until 4 May 1954 he held the prestigious position of Commander-General of the Carabinieri.

On 2 June 1956 he was awarded the title of Knight of the Grand Cross of the Order of Merit of the Italian Republic. He died in Rome on February 7, 1962.
