= Riccardo Moizo =

Italian aviation pioneer

- Born: 22 August 1877; Saliceto, Kingdom of Italy
- Died: 27 February 1962 (aged 84); Rome, Italy
- Military career
- Allegiance: Kingdom of Italy
- Branch: Royal Italian Army; Regia Aeronautica
- Rank: Lieutenant General
- Commands: Air Service Command; Commander-General of the Air Force; 6th Heavy Field Artillery Regiment; 3rd Heavy Field Artillery Regiment; 58th Infantry Division Legnano; 1st Cavalry Division Eugenio di Savoia; Commander-General of the Carabinieri
- Conflicts: Italo-Turkish War; World War I; Battles of the Isonzo; Battle of Vittorio Veneto; Second Italo-Ethiopian War; World War II
- Awards: Silver Medal of Military Valor (twice); War Merit Cross; Military Order of Savoy; Order of the Crown of Italy; Order of Saints Maurice and Lazarus; Colonial Order of the Star of Italy; Order of the Crown (Belgium)

Riccardo Moizo (22 August 1877 – 27 February 1962) was an Italian aviation pioneer in the early part of the 20th century (in which he was one of the founders of the Regia Aeronautica) and a general during World War II. He was Commander-General of the Carabinieri from 1935 to 1940 and the last High Commissioner of the Province of Ljubljana in 1943; from 1939 to 1943 he was also a member of the Italian Senate.

== Biography ==
=== Early years ===
He was born in Saliceto, province of Cuneo, on 22 August 1877, the son of Francesco Moizo and Ermenegilda Barberis. He enlisted in the Royal Italian Army on 14 October 1894, entering the Royal Military Academy of Artillery and Engineers in Turin, graduating on 4 July 1897 with the rank of artillery second lieutenant, after which he attended the School of Application of Artillery and Engineers. He was promoted to lieutenant on 1 September 1899, and at the end of the courses he was assigned to the 7th Coastal Artillery Brigade. Between October 1905 and August 1908 he attended the courses of the Army War School in Turin, at the end of which he was sent to Rome, at the headquarters of the Staff Officer Corps; on May 13, 1909 he was transferred to Turin and assigned to the staff of the I Army Corps. On 10 August of the same year he was promoted to captain and assigned to the 3rd Fortress Artillery Regiment until 2 June 1910, when he was transferred to the 1st Mountain Artillery Regiment, while continuing to serve at the command of the I Army Corps.

While in Turin he developed an interest in the world of aviation; attracted by the novelty of the aircraft, he attended a piloting course, being assigned to the Specialists Engineers Battalion on November 17, 1910. He moved to Rome where he began to follow the course to become an airplane pilot on the Centocelle airfield, which he completed at the Malpensa airfield, where on May 31, 1911 he obtained the airplane pilot license, followed on August 1 by the military pilot license. In that same month, flying on a Nieuport monoplane, he participated in the great maneuvers of the Royal Italian Army held in Monferrato, the first in Italy that saw the participation of aircraft, then still used only for reconnaissance.

=== Italo-Turkish War ===
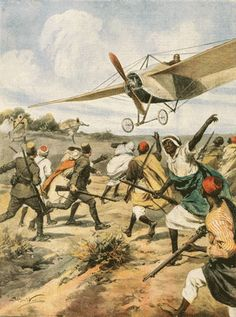
Cover of Domenica del Corriere depicting Captain Moizo's capture

In October 1911 the newly established Aviation Unit, consisting of a squadron of seven aircraft operating within the Specialists Engineers Battalion, was sent to Libya following the outbreak of the Italo-Turkish War; in addition to reconnaissance, its aircraft were tasked with direction of artillery fire, study of the ground and the first, rudimentary, bombing raids. On 23 October 1911, after taking off, Moizo located and followed the movements of about 2,000 Ottoman troops, while discovering that the town of Azizia was located 60 km from Tripoli and not eight, as erroneously indicated on the inaccurate maps of the time. This was the first strategic reconnaissance flight ever carried out by an airplane. He participated in the air operations from the beginning of the war, being repatriated on May 7, 1912, but due to the lack of pilots on August 12 he was again sent to Libya, where he was assigned to the Zuwarah airfield, located about 100 km from Tripoli. After some missions in which his plane had been plagued by mechanical problems, he was ordered to return to Tripoli and on the morning of 10 September 1912 he took off with his Nieuport, but due to an engine breakdown he was forced to crash land in enemy-controlled territory, being captured by Arab irregulars and taken to El Hascian. He was then handed over to soldiers of the Ottoman Army and transferred to Jadu, where he was held until the end of hostilities. As such, he was the first airplane pilot to be held as prisoner of war in history. He was repatriated in debilitated physical conditions due to the harsh conditions of his imprisonment, and after recovering he resumed service in November 1913, at the 2nd Mountain Artillery Regiment, being awarded with the Knight's Cross of the Military Order of Savoy for his fifty-nine wartime flights during the Italo-Turkish War.

=== World War I ===
In July 1914, while serving in Rome at the Army General Staff, he was placed at the disposal of the Ministry of the Colonies and assigned to the command of the troops of Tripolitania. In March 1915 he was repatriated and reassigned to the General Staff; after the entry of the Kingdom of Italy in the First World War, on 24 May 1915, he was attached to the Supreme Command as aeronautical consultant. He was promoted to major on July 7, and in December he was transferred to the Ministry of War, tasked with the organization and employment of the first air units. He was promoted to lieutenant colonel on December 16, 1916 and to colonel on August 16, 1917. On 26 August 1916 he married Countess Angelina Lovaria, with whom he had two children, Fabio and Gilda. In October 1917 he returned to the front, first as air force commander of the 3rd Army and then, until March 1918, as head of the aeronautical services office at the Supreme Command. For his merits as a pilot and organizer he was decorated with a silver medal for military valor. From 1 April 1918 he assumed the post of Chief of Staff of the 15th Division, and on 27 October he was seriously wounded in the head on Monte Pertica, in the Mount Grappa massif, being awarded a second Silver Medal for military valor.

=== Interwar years ===
Left almost blind, he spents several months recovering and returned to service in August 1919, assigned to the staff of the 8th Army with headquarters in Udine. He then returned to the air service; from November 1919 he served at the command of the Air Service of Rome, later becoming high commander of the Air Service and general director of Military Affairs of the Air Force Commissioner from January 1923; after the establishment of the Regia Aeronautica, he was transferred to the new armed force with the rank of Air Brigade General (air commodore). Between May 1923 and October 21 of the same year he was Commander-General of the Air Force, later replaced by Aldo Finzi. On December 30, 1923 he was transferred back to the Army at his request, with the rank of colonel, commanding the 6th Heavy Field Artillery Regiment from February 24, 1924 and the 3rd Heavy Field Artillery Regiment from November 1, 1926. He was promoted to brigadier general on February 21, 1929 and served at the artillery command of the Army Corps of Rome. On November 16, 1930 he became Inspector for the mobilization of the 21st Territorial Military Division of Rome, and on September 16, 1931 he was placed at the disposal of the designated army command of Florence.

On 1 December 1932 he was promoted to major general and became the first commander of the 6th Territorial Military Division of Milan, which in February 1934 became the 58th Infantry Division Legnano, and from 16 September 1934 he commanded the 1st Cavalry Division Eugenio di Savoia. On November 30, 1935 he was appointed Commander-General of the Carabinieri; during his tenure the Carabinieri Corps expanded considerably, and during the Second Italo-Ethiopian War the 3rd Carabinieri Division was established in southern Italy, which participated in operations in Ethiopia with truck-mounted units. After the proclamation of the Empire in East Africa, he set up Carabinieri commands and units in the newly conquered territories, and did the same after the conquest of Albania in 1939, incorporatine the Royal Albanian Gendarmerie in the Carabinieri.

On 1 October 1936 he was promoted to lieutenant general and on 25 March 1939 he was appointed Senator of the Kingdom. He was assigned to the Commission of Internal Affairs and Justice and later, from 23 January 1940, to that of the Armed Forces, dealing almost exclusively with issues related to the Carabinieri.

=== World War II and later years ===
In 1940 he supervised the general mobilization of the Carabinieri following the entry of the Kingdom of Italy in World War II. On 27 August of the same year he left the post of Commander General of the Royal Carabinieri Corps, being replaced by General Remo Gambelli.

On the eve of his final retirement, on 12 August 1943 he was appointed High Commissioner of the Province of Ljubljana by the new Badoglio government, but the worsening of the military situation did not give him time to exercise his powers, as the province had been declared a zone of operations. At the proclamation of the Armistice of Cassibile on 8 September 1943, Ljubljana was occupied by German forces, who put Moizo under house arrest where he remained until 10 October, with his formal dismissal being confirmed by the Italian Social Republic on 1 October. He was then allowed to return to Italy and moved to Camogli, where he remained until February 1944, when he learned he was being investigated and moved to Saliceto, his hometown, where he went into hiding. On March 1, following the arrest of his wife, he decided to turn himself in. He was then detained in the prisons of Verona, Venice and Brescia and tried by the Special Tribunal for the Defense of the State with the accusation of having favored the disbandment of the Italian troops in the province of Ljubljana after the armistice, but was acquitted and released on 6 October 1944.

He subsequently made contact with the National Liberation Committee through General Raffaele Cadorna, but the end of the Second World War came before he could have any employment within the CLN. He lost his post as senator due to a sentence by the High Court of Justice for the sanctions against Fascism delivered on February 6, 1945, but presented an appeal which was accepted by the Supreme Court of Cassation on June 9, 1947, when he retired to private life. He died in Rome on February 27, 1962.
