= Frignani =

Frignani is an Italian surname. Notable people with the surname include:

- Amleto Frignani (1932–1997), Italian footballer
- Daniele Frignani (born 1977), Italian baseball player
- Giovanni Frignani (1897–1944), Italian soldier and Resistance member
