= Brunetto Brunetti =

Italian general (1887–1947)

- Born: 25 November 1887; Pesaro, Kingdom of Italy
- Died: 5 April 1947 (aged 59); Rome, Italy
- Military career
- Allegiance: Kingdom of Italy; Italy
- Branch: Royal Italian Army; Italian Army
- Service years: 1905–1947
- Rank: Major General
- Commands: 22nd Artillery Regiment; Application School of Artillery and Engineers; 28th Infantry Division Aosta; 27th Infantry Division Brescia; Armed Forces of Sardinia; Commander-General of the Carabinieri
- Conflicts: Italo-Turkish War; World War I; World War II; Second battle of El Alamein
- Awards: Bronze Medal of Military Valour; War Cross for Military Valor; Order of the Crown of Italy

Brunetto Brunetti (Pesaro, 25 November 1887 – Rome, 5 April 1947) was an Italian general during World War II. He was Commander-General of the Carabinieri from 1945 to 1947.

== Biography ==
A cadet in the Military Academy of Artillery and Engineers of Turin since November 1905, Brunetti was commissioned as artillery second lieutenant on 3 August 1908. On 12 August 1910 he was promoted to lieutenant in the 13th Field Artillery Regiment, and fought in the Italo-Turkish War and then, with the ranks of captain and later major in the Great War. He attended the War School and was later assigned to the Central Artillery School, being promoted to lieutenant colonel in 1926.

On 3 July 1935 he was promoted to colonel and assumed command of the 22nd Artillery Regiment in Sicily; in 1937 he became commander of the Application School of Artillery and Engineers and on 30 June 1939 he was promoted to the rank of brigadier general. He commanded the artillery of the Palermo Corps and then of the XII Corps, and from 1 May to 5 October 1942 he was in command of the 28th Infantry Division Aosta, stationed in Sicily.

On 28 June 1942 he was promoted to major general, and on 19 October he was sent to Egypt, where he assumed command of the 27th Infantry Division Brescia, replacing General Alessandro Predieri, who had been killed by a landmine. The division was destroyed in the second battle of El Alamein, which started only four days after he had assumed command, and at the end of which Brunetti was captured by the British and sent to a POW Camp in Great Britain.

In 1944 he was released following the Armistice of Cassibile and Italy's new status as a co-belligerent with the Allies, and was placed at the disposal of the Ministry of War. He was assigned to the Armed Forces Command of Sardinia as acting commander until 7 March 1945, when he replaced General Taddeo Orlando as Commander-General of the Carabinieri.

On 10 May 1946, he issued a document entitled "Contegno dell'Arma durante e dopo le elezioni politiche" ("Behaviour of the [Carabinieri] Corps during and after the political elections") in view of the referendum scheduled for 2 June 1946. In this document, Brunetti addressed all the Carabinieri by pointing out their role as "apolitical by tendency and tradition" and respectful of the "popular will". He played a decisive role in mediating with the Allies who intended to apply the British model to the Italian police forces, convincing them of the validity of the regulations of the Carabinieri which therefore avoided substantial organizational change.

He died in office on 5 April 1947, following a sudden illness, and was buried in Civitavecchia.
