= Angelo Cerica =

Italian general and senator (1885–1961)

Member of the Senate of the Republic
- President of the Senate of the Republic: Ivanoe Bonomi; Enrico De Nicola; Giuseppe Paratore; Meuccio Ruini; Cesare Merzagora
- Preceded by: (none)
- Succeeded by: Carlo Latini
- In office 8 May 1948 – 24 June 1953
- In office 25 June 1953 – 11 June 1958
- In office 12 June 1958 – 11 April 1961 (deceased)

Personal details
- Born: 30 September 1885 Alatri, Kingdom of Italy
- Died: 11 April 1961 (aged 75) Rome, Italian Republic
- Citizenship: Italian
- Party: Christian Democratic Party of Italy
- Awards: Order of the Crown of Italy; Colonial Order of the Star of Italy; Sovereign Military Order of Malta; Order of Saints Maurice and Lazarus; Golden Cross of Miliatary Service; Silver Medal of Military Valor; War Merit Cross; Silver War Merit Medal; Medal of Freedom with Silver Palm

Military service
- Branch/service: Carabinieri
- Years of service: 1906–1951
- Rank: Corps General
- Commands: Carabinieri
- Battles/wars: World War I Second Italo-Abyssinian War; World War II

Angelo Cerica (30 September 1885 – 11 April 1961) was an Italian general and senator.

== Biography ==
=== Early life ===
Born to Pietro Felice and Luisa Villa in Alatri, Cerica attended the Conti-Gentili Lyceum in his native town and later entered a military academy. At September 1906, he was commissioned as a second lieutenant and joined the 74th Infantry Regiment, being promoted to full lieutenant in June 1909. During June 1912, he was transferred to the Carabinieri Corps. Cerica participated in World War I, attaining the rank of captain in October 1916. At September 1920, he was further promoted to major and became a lieutenant colonel in February 1927. During the Second Italo-Abyssinian War, Cerica was appointed commander of the Carabinieri Legion in Asmara, an office he held from September 1936 to June 1939. On 10 January 1939 he was promoted to colonel. Due to exceptional merit, he received the rank of brigadier general on June 19 that year, becoming the chief of Carabinieri forces in Italian East Africa. He served in the same capacity in Italian North Africa from July 1940 until February 1941. Cerica was posted back to Italy, attained the rank of Divisional General on 22 June 1942 and was made commander of the 4th Carabinieri Podgora Detachment.

=== Anti-Mussolini plot ===
General Azolino Hazon, commander of the Carabinieri Corps, was killed in a bombing raid on 19 July 1943; Cerica was called to replace him, although he formally assumed his responsibilities only on 23 July. He had been approved by General Vittorio Ambrosio after the latter ascertained that Cerica would cooperate with the anti-Benito Mussolini faction, the members of which were planning to depose the Duce. Cerica organized Mussolini's arrest after his interview with King Victor Emmanuel III in Villa Savoia, on 25 July, and directed his forces to prevent riots in the capital. He was promoted to Corps General on 8 August.

=== Later years ===
On 9 September, a day after the Badoglio Proclamation prompted the Germans to invade Italy, Cerica led a battalion of cadets in battle against the enemy on the Via Ostiensis, and was defeated. Being sought by the occupation authorities, he went into hiding on 11 September and joined a partisans unit in Abruzzo. He participated in their actions until the liberation of the area. Afterwards, Cerica headed a department in the Italian Co-Belligerent Army's General Staff until the war's end. He then commanded the military forces in Emilia-Romagna for a month, leaving his post in June 1945.

Cerica served as the President of the Supreme Military Court from May 1947 to September 1951. He was also a Member of the Senate for the Christian Democracy Party in the First, Second and Third Legislatures of Parliament.

Military offices
Preceded by Azolino Hazon	Commander-in-Chief of the Carabinieri Corps; 23 July 1943 - 11 September 1943	Succeeded by Giuseppe Pièche
