= Sabato Martelli Castaldi =

Italian Air Force general

- Born: 19 August 1896; Cava de' Tirreni, Kingdom of Italy
- Died: 24 March 1944 (aged 47); Rome, Italian Social Republic
- Military career
- Allegiance: Kingdom of Italy
- Branch: Royal Italian Army; Regia Aeronautica
- Rank: Air Brigade General
- Conflicts: World War I; Battles of the Isonzo; World War II
- Awards: Gold Medal of Military Valor (posthumous); Silver Medal of Military Valor; Bronze Medal of Military Valor (three times)

Sabato Martelli Castaldi (19 August 1896 – 24 March 1944) was an Italian Air Force general and a member of the Italian Resistance during World War II. He was executed during the Ardeatine massacre.

== Biography ==
He participated as a volunteer in the First World War, initially as an artillery Lieutenant and later in the Army Air Corps; from 23 April 1918 he was a pilot in the 4th SVA Section, based in Treviso and Vedelago, which from 20 October became the 56th Squadron, earning a Silver and two Bronze Medals of Military Valor. After the war, he graduated in aeronautical engineering at the Polytechnic of Turin. From 1919 to 1921, he served in the Army Air Corps in Libya, participating in operations against the Senussi rebels, after which he returned to Italy; he played an important role in the creation of the Regia Aeronautica, which he joined immediately after its establishment in 1923. In the same period, he also joined the National Fascist Party.

In 1931, with the rank of colonel, he became chief of staff of Air Marshal Italo Balbo, Minister of the Air Force, participating in the Decennial Air Cruise and being entrusted with the rapport between Balbo and Benito Mussolini. In 1933, at only thirty-six years of age, he was promoted to air brigadier general (equivalent to air commodore), becoming the youngest general in the Italian Air Force. After Balbo's replacement with General Giuseppe Valle, however, he soon fell out of favour, like other officers closely linked with Balbo, whose relationship with Mussolini had become strained. In November 1935, he was forcibly discharged from active service "for lack of judgment", after reporting some embezzlement issues within the Air Force and writing a report to Mussolini about the deficiencies within the Air Force under the leadership of Valle.

Returning to civilian life, he was persecuted by the OVRA and unable to find a job in Italy, thus being forced to migrate to Italian East Africa. He later returned to Italy, where he was hired by the Stacchini powder factory in Rome along with his lifelong friend Roberto Lordi, who had fought beside him during World War I and who had also become a general in the Regia Aeronautica until being likewise forced to resign in 1935.

After the Armistice of Cassibile, in the morning of 9 September 1943, Martelli Castaldi and another two officers reached the Quirinale Palace in order to inform King Victor Emmanuel III of their wish to organize the defence of Rome against the invading Germans, but found that the king and the government had fled the city. On the following day, Martelli Castaldi and Lordi were among the civilians who joined the troops battling the Germans near Porta San Paolo, rushing into combat armed with hunting rifles. After the German occupation of the capital, both generals joined the Clandestine Military Front; Martelli Castaldi established contact with the Allies, distributed explosives to the partisans and organized armed groups. He was suggested by several members of the Front as a possible leader, but Giuseppe Cordero Lanza di Montezemolo was chosen instead. On 17 January 1944, the SS, having discovered Martelli Castaldi's and Lordi's Resistance activities but having been unable to find them, arrested their employer, Ernesto Stacchini; the two generals then turned themselves in, in exchange for his release. They were imprisoned in the SS prison in Via Tasso and tortured for over a month and then executed in the Fosse Ardeatine massacre on 24 March 1944. Before his execution, Martelli Castaldi wrote a last message on the wall of his cell, which he shared with Carabinieri Lieutenant Colonel Giovanni Frignani: "When your body will no longer be, your spirit will be even more alive in the memory of those who remain. Let it may always be an example". He was posthumously awarded the Gold Medal of Military Valor.
