= Motorized Corps (Italy) =

The Motorized Corps (Italian: Corpo d'armata autotrasportabile) was a corps of the Royal Italian Army during World War II which existed between June 1939 and May 1942.

== History ==
On 1 June 1939, the Corpo d'armata autotrasportabile is formed in Cremona under the command of Major General Remo Gambelli. On 1 December 1939 the command was assumed by Major General Francesco Zingales. At the start of World War II, the Corps became part of the 6th Army and is based in Vicenza.

The Corps participated in the Axis invasion of Yugoslavia in April 1941 and conquered Šibenik, Split, Dubrovnik and Trebinje.
In early May 1942 it is repatriated to Italy and is reformed into the Italian Expeditionary Corps in Russia.
