= Filippo Caruso =

Italian Carabinieri general and Resistance member

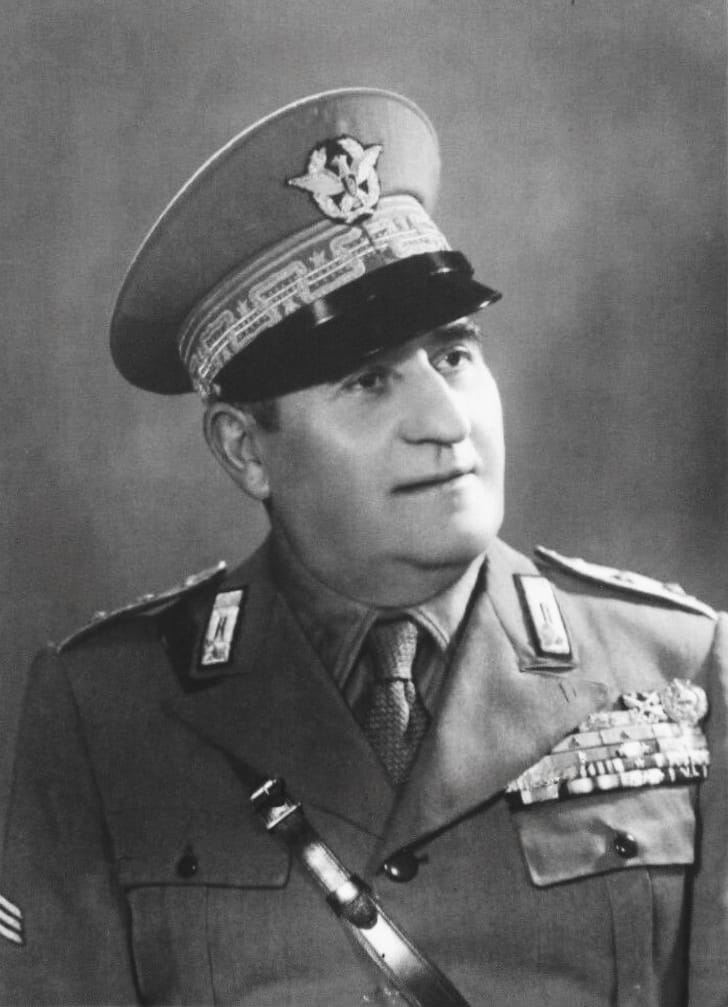
- Born: 24 August 1884; Casole Bruzio, Kingdom of Italy
- Died: 12 September 1979 (aged 95); Rome, Italy
- Military career
- Allegiance: Kingdom of Italy; Italy
- Branch: Royal Italian Army; Italian Army
- Service years: 1905–1957
- Rank: Major General
- Commands: Carabinieri Legion of Ancona; 3rd Carabinieri Brigade; 2nd Carabinieri Division "Podgora"
- Conflicts: Italo-Turkish War; World War I; Battles of the Isonzo; Battle of Caporetto; Battle of Vittorio Veneto; World War II
- Awards: Gold Medal of Military Valour; Bronze Medal of Military Valour

Filippo Caruso (Casole Bruzio, 24 August 1884 – Rome, 12 September 1979) was an Italian Carabinieri general and Resistance member during World War II.

== Biography ==
Caruso was born into a bourgeois family with military and patriotic traditions; some of his ancestors had participated in the Risorgimento. He began his military career in 1905, enlisting in the Royal Italian Army as a second lieutenant in the 44th Infantry Regiment; after attending courses at the Royal Military Academy of Infantry and Cavalry in Modena, he became a career officer in 1909, assigned to the 18th Infantry Regiment, with which he fought in Libya in the Italo-Turkish War (1911–12). After being promoted to lieutenant and returning to Italy, in 1914 he was transferred to the Carabinieri Corps. He participated in the First World War, fighting in the 11th Division on the middle course of the Isonzo and then serving with the 114th Carabinieri Section at the Supreme Command. After promotion captain in 1917, he fought with the 26th Division, and distinguished himself during the advance on Trento and Bolzano following the battle of Vittorio Veneto in October–November 1918. By the end of the war he had been decorated with two bronze medals for military valor.

Between December 1918 and July 1919 he was the organizer of the territorial service of the Carabinieri in South Tyrol and later in Dalmatia. He was then appointed commander of a Carabinieri company in Florence, distinguishing himself during the subsequent period of upheaval in Tuscany. He operated in Trieste during the Fiume crisis, receiving a solemn commendation for his behavior. After promotion to major in April 1925, while serving with the Carabinieri Legion of Livorno, he graduated in law. Returning to Florence, he assumed command of the internal division of the Carabinieri, being promoted to lieutenant colonel and receiving a third solemn commendation. Between October 1931 and September 1933 he was commander of the Carabinieri cadet detachment of Turin. From September 1933 to January 1935 he was in command of the Carabinieri of the General Police Inspectorate in Sicily. In July 1937 he was promoted to colonel, assuming command of the Carabinieri Legion of Ancona, and between February 1940 and September 1941 he was interim commander of the 3rd Carabinieri Brigade. In August 1941 he was transferred to Rome and appointed chief of staff and general inspector of the consortium for the rationing and distribution of meat to the armed forces and to the civilian population at the Ministry of Agriculture and Forestry. In January 1942 he was promoted to brigadier general, serving in Rome at the 2nd Carabinieri Division "Podgora", and in March 1943 he was discharged on demand due to reaching age limits.

After the Armistice of Cassibile and the German occupation of Rome in September 1943, Caruso, who still lived in the capital, founded a Resistance group known as "Banda Caruso", which in November 1943 merged with the Carabinieri branch of the Clandestine Military Front, of which he became the leader. On May 25, 1944, he was arrested by the German police and imprisoned in the SS prison in via Tasso, where he was subjected to prolonged torture in the unsuccessful attempt to force him to reveal the names of other Resistance members. He managed to escape as Allied troops entered Rome. For his Resistance activities he was awarded the Gold Medal of Military Valor, and from July 1944 he resumed his service with inspection tasks in the reorganized Carabinieri departments of southern Italy and in the 3rd "Ogaden" Carabinieri Division. After the war, having been promoted to division general for war merits, from July 1946 he commanded the 2nd Carabinieri Division "Podgora", and from April 1949 he was placed at the disposal of the Ministry of Defense for special assignments. He was placed on absolute leave in April 1957 and received the status of disabled veteran due to permanent injuries caused by torture. He died in Rome on 12 September 1979.
