= Remo Gambelli =

Italian general

- Born: 23 February 1880; Bologna, Kingdom of Italy
- Died: 2 August 1976 (aged 96); Canale Monterano, Italy
- Military career
- Allegiance: Kingdom of Italy
- Branch: Royal Italian Army
- Rank: Lieutenant general
- Commands: 1st Heavy Artillery Regiment; 18th Infantry Division Messina; Motorized Corps; VIII Army Corps; 1st Army; Commander-General of the Carabinieri
- Conflicts: Italo-Turkish War; Battle of Ain Zara; Battle of Misrata; World War I; Second Battle of Monte Grappa; Battle of Vittorio Veneto; World War II
- Awards: Silver Medal of Military Valor (twice); Bronze Medal of Military Valor; War Merit Cross; Order of the Crown of Italy; Order of Saints Maurice and Lazarus

Remo Gambelli (Bologna, 23 February 1880 – Canale Monterano, 2 August 1976) was an Italian general during World War II, Commander-General of the Carabinieri from August 1940 to February 1943.

== Biography ==
He was born in Bologna in 1880 and entered the Military Academy of Modena in 1899, graduating in 1901 with the rank of second lieutenant. In 1911–1912 he participated in the Italo-Turkish War as a mountain artillery officer, earning a Bronze Medal of Military Valor for his role in the battle of Ain Zara and a Silver Medal of Military Valor for his behaviour during the battle of Misrata. During the First World War he was promoted to major and then to lieutenant colonel, earning another Silver Medal for his role in the second battle of Monte Grappa and in the battle of Vittorio Veneto.

In 1923 he married Miss Teresa Erzoek. In 1926 he was promoted to colonel, and in 1929 he assumed command of the 1st Heavy Artillery Regiment. After the death of his wife in 1932, in 1934 he remarried with Giorgia Letizia Erzoek. In 1933 he was promoted to brigadier general and appointed commander of the artillery of the Army Corps of Florence, and in 1935 he became chief of staff of the Army Corps of Turin. In January 1937 he was promoted to major general and given command of the "Metauro" Infantry Division in Ancona, which in 1939 was renamed 18th Infantry Division Messina; in May 1939 he assumed command of the Motorized Corps, with headquarters in Cremona.

In July 1939 he became lieutenant general, and in November he assumed command of the Army Corps of Rome; on 11 June 1940, the day after Italy's entry into World War II, the Army Corps of Rome was renamed VIII Army Corps. After being briefly in command of the 1st Army, on 27 August 1940 he was appointed Commander-General of the Carabinieri, a post he held until 22 February 1943, when he left due to age limits, being replaced by General Azolino Hazon. He was then retained in service and attached to the Ministry of War, with the post of director-general of the recruitment of non-commissioned officers and soldiers, which he held until 31 July 1944.

After the war he held various tasks within the Ministry of Defense, being finally discharged in 1954. He died in Canale Monterano in 1976.
