= Azolino Hazon =

Italian general (1883–1943)

- Born: 20 July 1883; Turin, Kingdom of Italy
- Died: 19 July 1943 (aged 59); Rome, Kingdom of Italy
- Military career
- Allegiance: Kingdom of Italy
- Branch: Royal Italian Army
- Service years: 1904–1943
- Rank: Major General
- Commands: 4th Carabinieri Brigade; 5th Carabinieri Brigade; 2nd Carabinieri Division "Podgora"; Commander-General of the Carabinieri
- Conflicts: Italo-Turkish War; World War I; Second Italo-Ethiopian War; World War II
- Awards: Silver Medal of Military Valour (posthumous); War Cross for Military Valor; War Merit Cross (three times); Order of the Crown of Italy; Colonial Order of the Star of Italy

Azolino Hazon (20 July 1883 – 19 July 1943) was an Italian general during World War II, Commander-General of the Carabinieri from February 1943 till his death during the bombing of Rome.

== Biography ==
Hazon entered the Military School on 5 November 1904 and graduated as second lieutenant on 14 September 1906. He began his service within 6th Alpini Regiment, with which he fought in Libya during the Italo-Turkish War. On 31 March 1912 he was transferred to the Carabinieri corps and assigned to the Cadet Legion and then to the Bologna Legion. He was later transferred to the Rome Legion and participated in the First World War with the rank of lieutenant and later captain.

He was promoted to major in 1920 and to lieutenant colonel in 1927, and served in various territorial commands. On 17 December 1934, after promotion to colonel, he was appointed Inspector of the IV Zone (Rome). He participated in the Second Italo-Ethiopian War and on 7 September 1937, for the merits achieved in this conflict, he was promoted "for exceptional merits" to brigadier general, receiving command of the 5th and then of the 4th Carabinieri Brigade.

On 10 November 1940 he was promoted to major general and given command of the 2nd Carabinieri Division "Podgora". On 22 June 1942 he was appointed Deputy Commander General of the Carabinieri, and on 23 February 1943 he became Commander-General of the Carabinieri; he was the first Carabinieri officer to become Commander-General of the corps, all his predecessors having come from the ranks of the Army.

Hazon perished during the first Allied air raid on Rome, on 19 July 1943. After the first wave of bombers had dropped its bombs, Hazon rushed towards the San Lorenzo district, which had suffered the heaviest damage, along with his chief of staff, Colonel Ulderico Barengo, to co-ordinate rescue efforts; they were caught en route by the incoming second wave and a bomb exploded near their car, killing both. His funeral, held on 21 July 1943, was the last public ceremony in Italy at which the Marcia Reale, the anthem of the House of Savoy, and Giovinezza, the anthem of Fascism, were played together.

Hazon was posthumously awarded the Silver Medal of Military Valour.
