= Leonardo Gallitelli =

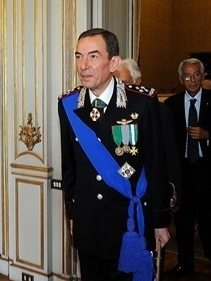
Gallitelli in 2009

General Leonardo Gallitelli (born 9 June 1948 in Taranto) is an Italian general and politician. He served as commander of the Carabinieri from June 2009 to 15 January 2015.

== History ==
In his youth he moved to Bernalda in the province of Matera. He began his military career on 22 October 1967 and began attending courses at the military academy in Modena and studied at the Carabinieri School in Rome, graduating in law. He was editor-in-chief of Il Carabiniere, the monthly magazine published by the Arms of Carabinieri.

=== Military career ===
He was commander of the Compagnie of Viggiano, Aosta and Genova Portoria. He worked at the Investigative Nucleus in Turin with significant commitments to countering terrorism and kidnapping.

Later he worked in the general staff of the General Command, as the superior officer in the Provincial Command of Turin, the Operations Office of the General Command of the Army. He was promoted to colonel and became deputy commander of the Carabinieri Region of Piedmont and Valle d'Aosta at the orders of General Francesco Delfino. He was in that position until 1993 and subsequently held the Provincial Command of Rome for five years. He was later the head of the Second Division of the General Command. From 2000 to 2002 he was Senior Officer of the General Command and then commander of the Carabinieri Officers' School. From 7 October 2003 to 4 September 2006, he headed the Campania Carabinieri Region.

From 5 September 2006 to 11 June 2009 he was chief of staff of the General Command of the Army. On 12 June 2009, Leonardo Gallitelli was appointed commander-in-chief of the Army by the Council of Ministers.

Among the reactions to his appointment was that of then Defense Minister Ignazio La Russa, who said: " It was a very difficult choice because more than one generals were at the same level of degree and capacity and it was hard It was a weighted choice, on my proposal, welcomed by the entire Council of Ministers, who expressed great appreciation for the new general commander of the Leonardo Leonardo Gallitelli." Democratic Party Defense and Security Officers Roberta Pinotti and Marco Minniti expressed "Great appreciation for the nomination to Commander-in-Chief of the Carabinieri, an excellent choice for expertise and experience. We are confident that General Gallitelli will do the best to accomplish the delicate task to which has been called."

He formally ended his military service on 16 January 2015 when he was replaced as commander by General Tullio Del Sette.

=== Post-military career ===
On 15 September 2015 Gallitelli was appointed head of Anti-Doping Bureau. The chairman of CONI Giovanni Malagò said, "This is a person of great credibility, reference and curriculum".

In November 2017, Silvio Berlusconi suggested Gallitelli could serve as Prime Minister of Italy if a scenario in which Forza Italia formed a coalition following the 2018 general election.

== Personal life ==
He is married and has two children.

== Decorations ==
- Chancellor of the Order of Merit of the Italian Republic
- Knight of the Order of Merit of the Italian Republic
- Knight of the Order of the Italian Republic
- "Initiative of the President of the Republic" – Rome, 21 July 2009
- Great Official of the Order of Merit of the Italian Republic – 2 June 2008
- Commander of the Order to the Merit of the Italian Republic – 2 June 1993
- Maurizio Medal for the Merit of 10 Military Care Luster
- Military Medal for long-standing merit
- Gold Cross for Service Seniority
