= Taddeo Orlando =

Italian politician

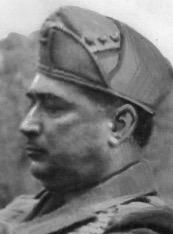
- Born: 23 June 1885; Gaeta, Kingdom of Italy
- Died: 1 September 1950 (aged 65); Rome, Italy
- Military career
- Allegiance: Kingdom of Italy
- Branch: Royal Italian Army
- Rank: General
- Commands: 21st Infantry Division Granatieri di Sardegna; 2nd Alpine Group; 11th Infantry Division Brennero; XXXI Corps; XX Corps; Carabinieri Corps
- Conflicts: Italo-Turkish War; World War I; World War II; Axis invasion of Yugoslavia; Tunisian Campaign; Battle of Medenine
- Awards: Silver Medal of Military Valour; Bronze Medal of Military Valour (twice); Military Order of Savoy

Taddeo Orlando (23 June 1885 – 1 September 1950) was an Italian general who served in the Italo-Turkish War, World War I, and World War II.

== Biography ==
Orlando was born in Gaeta on June 23, 1885. He attended the Military College of the Nunziatella in Naples and then the Royal Military Academy of Artillery and Engineers in Turin. He graduated as Second Lieutenant in 1906 and was promoted to Lieutenant in 1908, and took part in the Italo-Turkish War (1911–1912), where he distinguished himself and was decorated with a Bronze Medal of Military Valour. He then attended the Army School of War from 1912 to 1914 and later participated in World War I serving first in an artillery battery and later in the General Staff. In October 1918 he was promoted to lieutenant colonel; during the war he was awarded a Silver Medal and a second Bronze Medal of Military Valour. In 1919 he was transferred to the General Staff of the Royal Army where he also held the post of division chief director.

On November 20, 1930, he was promoted to colonel, and in 1936 he was stationed in Tripolitania as artillery commander. On 1 July 1937 he was promoted to brigadier general and briefly served at the Ministry of Italian Africa; in September of the same year he assumed command of the artillery of the XX Army Corps, stationed in Libya. Between June 1938 and November 1939 he was chief of staff of the Third Army, and then Deputy Chief of Staff for operations at the General Staff of the Royal Italian Army. On 1 January 1940 he was promoted to major general and on 1 April he assumed the position of commander of the 21st Infantry Division Granatieri di Sardegna.

Following the outbreak of the Second World War he participated in the Axis invasion of Yugoslavia and subsequently led the repression of partisan activity in Slovenia, for which he was later included in the CROWCASS list as a war criminal wanted by Yugoslavia. He remained in command of the division until November 13, 1942, when he was repatriated and became commander of the XXXI Army Corps, with headquarters in Catanzaro.

On February 8, 1943, Orlando was sent to Tunisia to take command of the XX Army Corps, part of the 1st Army of General Giovanni Messe, and was promoted to lieutenant general for war merit on May 13 of the same year. After the surrender of the Axis forces in North Africa, he was transferred to England as a prisoner of war.

In November 1943 Orlando, along with Messe and General Paolo Berardi, was released and repatriated at the request of the "Kingdom of the South", now co-belligerent with the Allies, and on 16 November he was appointed Undersecretary of State at the Ministry of War in the first Badoglio Government, a position he held until February 12, 1944, when he was appointed Minister of War, which he continued to hold during the second Badoglio cabinet, until June 18, 1944. After the government fell, on July 20, 1944, he assumed the position of Commander General of the Carabinieri Corps.

He left that post on March 6, 1945, following the controversy that arose over the flight of General Mario Roatta, his former superior in Slovenia in 1942, and the request presented by the Yugoslav government for his extradition in relation to alleged war crimes committed by him in Slovenia.

He later held the position of Secretary General of the Ministry of Defense. In 1946 he published his memoirs, Vittoria di un popolo, starting with the Tunisian campaign, followed by captivity in Great Britain and later the reconstruction of the Italian army.
