= Museum of the Liberation of Rome =

Museum set in former SS headquarters in Rome, Italy

- Museo storico della Liberazione - Roma
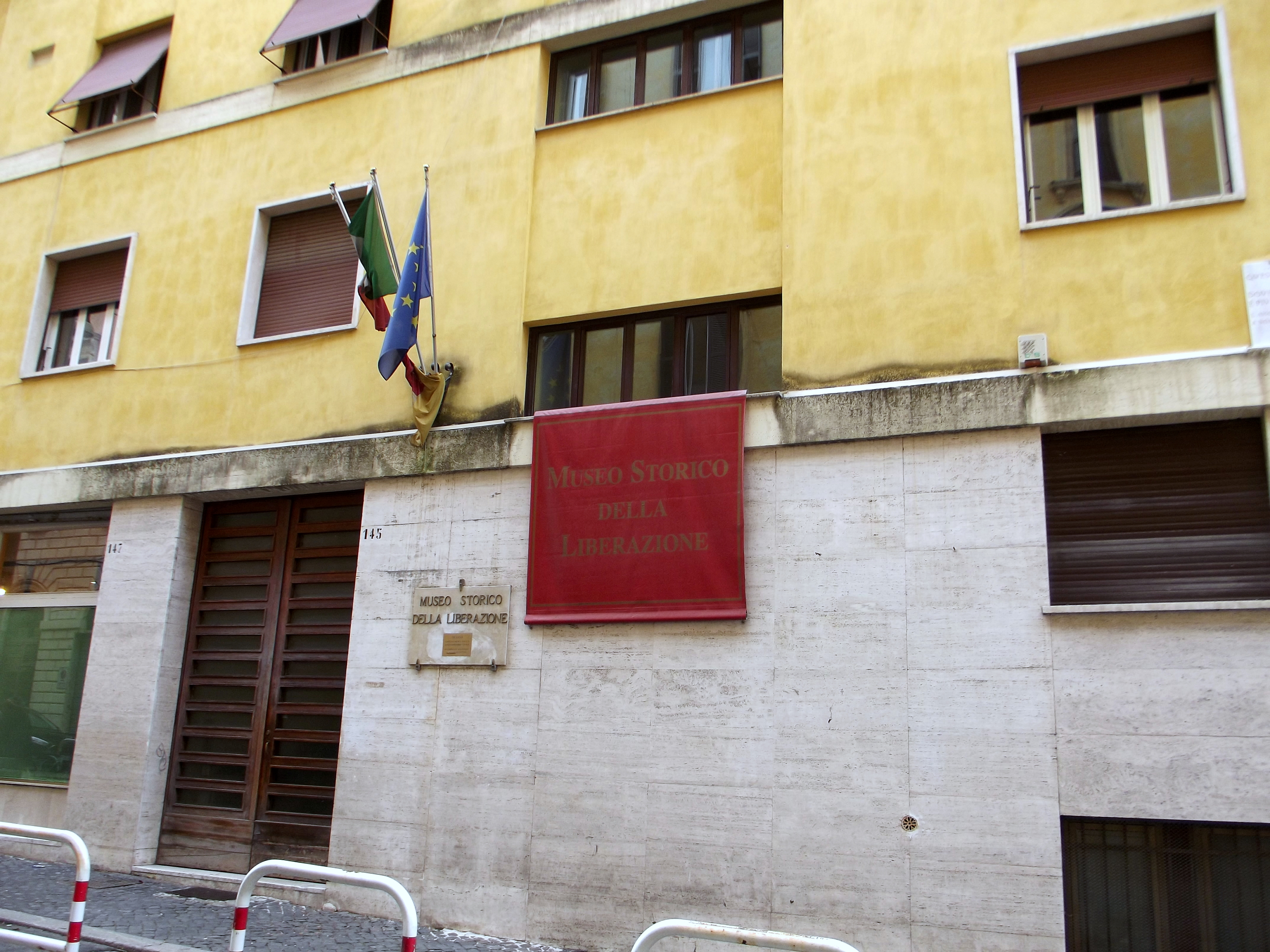
- The Liberation Museum at Via Tasso 145, Rome
- Click on the map for a fullscreen view
- Established: 1957
- Location: Via Tasso 145
- Coordinates: 41°53′19″N 12°30′23″E
- Type: War museum
- Visitors: 15,000 per annum
- Public transit access: Manzoni metro station
- Website: www.museoliberazione.it/en/

The Museum of the Liberation of Rome (Italian: Museo storico della Liberazione - Roma) is located in an apartment building at Via Tasso 145, Rome, close to the basilica of St. John Lateran. It records the period of German occupation of Rome (September 1943 – June 1944) in the Second World War and its subsequent liberation. The building housing the museum was used by the SS to torture members of the Italian Resistance in the first half of 1944.

== History ==
Following completion of the building in the late 1930s, it was rented to the German Embassy in Rome and initially used as that embassy's Cultural Office. The headquarters of the Sicherheitspolizei (SiPo), an agency of the SS, led by Herbert Kappler, were established there from 11 September 1943 and occupied the building until the German retreat from Rome. Under Kappler it was transformed into a prison, with the rooms being turned into cells. In January 1944 all windows were walled up to facilitate imprisonment, interrogations and torture of some of the most important figures of the Italian resistance, with an estimated 2000 people passing through the building. On 4 June 1944, the day of the Liberation of Rome, the population entered the building and freed those prisoners who had not been taken and subsequently murdered by the retreating SS.

Following donation of the apartments occupied by the SS to the Italian State in 1950 the museum was established to record the period of German occupation and Rome's subsequent liberation. The donation, by Princess Josepha Ruspoli in Savorgnan di Brazzà, specifically required the rooms to be used as a museum for that purpose. After an initial opening of a few rooms in 1955 by the Italian President Giovanni Gronchi, it was definitively opened in 1957. Sources of materials for the exhibition included Gestapo files and documents provided by the people of Rome, particularly those associated with the resistance. On the night between 22 and 23 November 1999 there was an explosion outside the museum that caused some slight damage. This attempt was believed to have been anti-Semitic in nature. On the following 8 December, 3500 people demonstrated outside the museum in solidarity. In 2007, the nearby metro station of Manzoni was renamed Manzoni - Museo della Liberazione in honour of the museum.

== The museum ==
The museum occupies three floors. In addition to recording the torture that took place on the site, it details the persecution of Rome's Jews, with copies of newspaper reports and posters imposing bans and anti-Jewish orders. It also covers the underground struggle, exhibiting manifestos and handbills of the resistance. It provides information about those imprisoned in Via Tasso and pays particular attention to the Ardeatine Massacre when some of the 335 victims were taken from the prisons of Via Tasso. In some of the cells writings in pencil on the plaster and other graffiti provide touching messages of life and freedom, often written by prisoners nearing death.

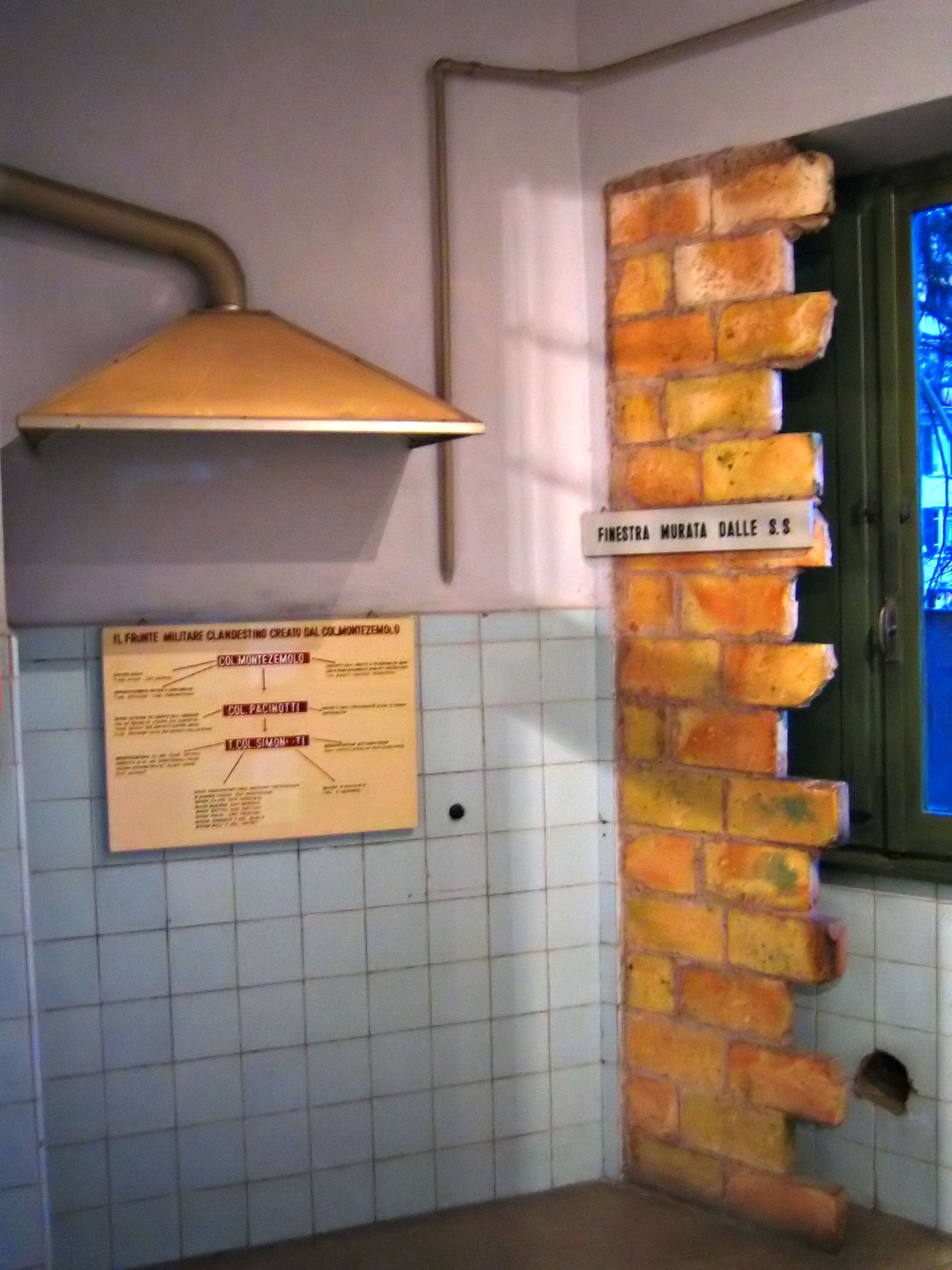
Via Tasso 145, Rome. The kitchen was converted into a cell by the SS.

== The rooms ==
- Ground floor

In addition to the reception area the ground floor has a conference room and a library, which is particularly devoted to the resistance and contains a large number of rare pamphlets and newspapers related to the period.

- First floor

This contains five cells. Cell 1, the largest, concerns the Ardeatine Massacre. Cell 2 was used for solitary confinement. This, and one on the upper floor, was not covered with wallpaper and displays evidence of messages scratched in the plaster by the prisoners. Cell 3 is devoted to Forte Bravetta, a location on Rome's Janiculum that was used by the Germans for executions, and to the people who died there. Cell 4 remembers the 14 prisoners taken by the SS when they retreated from Rome, and their execution at La Storta on 4 June 1944. Cell 5 was a kitchen converted into an isolation unit. It contains the white flag used by Roman officials in negotiating an ”open city” status with Marshal Kesselring, commander of the German forces in Italy.

- Second floor

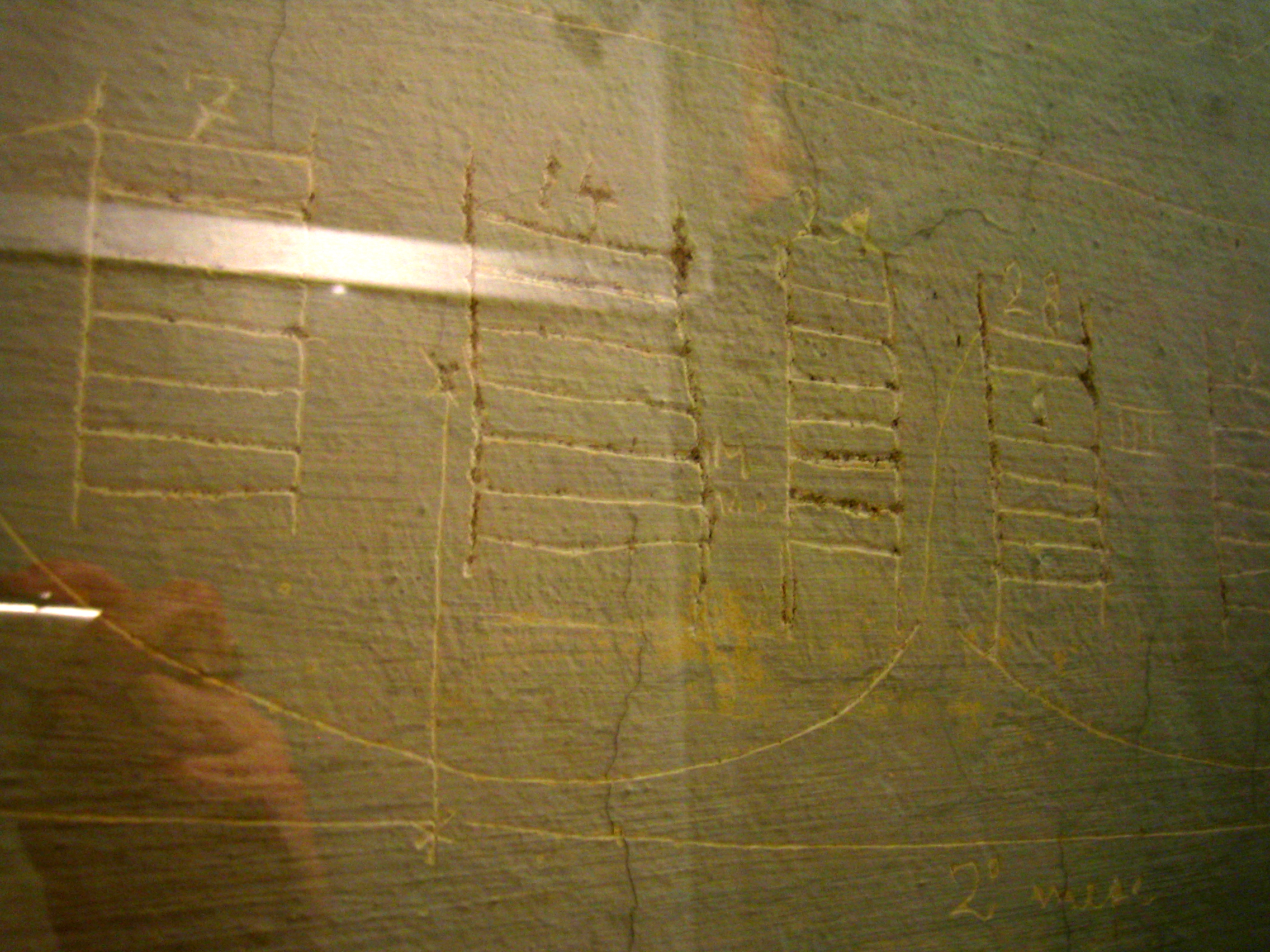
Graffiti in the form of a calendar

This has 5 cells with exhibitions, in two apartments. Cell 11 contains posters that give orders to and impose restrictions on the population. Cell 12 is the second isolation cell that contains scratched messages from the prisoners. Cell 13 displays newspapers and other memories of the resistance. This display is continued in Cell 14, which also contains the Italian flag raised on the Capitoline Hill in Rome on the day of Liberation. In the second apartment, the one exhibition room records the arrest by the SS of 1259 Jewish citizens from the Roman Ghetto in October 1943.

- Third floor

Cell number 12 is the isolation cell and shows graffiti scratched on the wall by J. Lloyd of the British Army with a picture of a Union Jack planted on a hill.

Preceded by Museum of the Ara Pacis	Landmarks of Rome; Museum of the Liberation of Rome	Succeeded by National Museum of Oriental Art
