= Colonial Order of the Star of Italy =

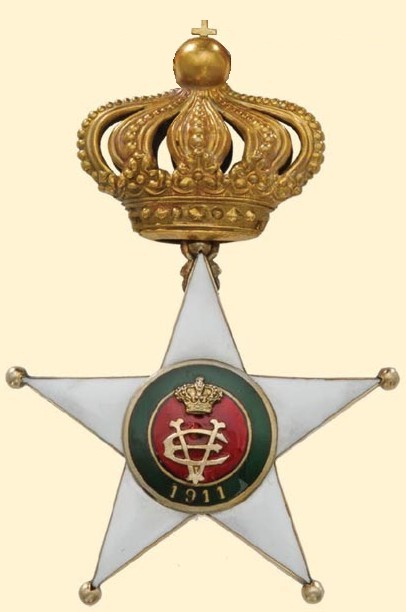
- The insignia of the colonial order
- Type: State Order
- Awarded for: Service in the Italian colonies
- Presented by: Kingdom of Italy
- Status: No longer awarded
- Established: 18 January 1914
- Final award: 2 June 1946

The Colonial Order of the Star of Italy (Italian: Ordine coloniale della Stella d'Italia [ˈordine koloˈnjaːle della ˈstεlla diˈtaːlja]) was founded as a colonial order of chivalry on 18 June 1914 by Italian King Victor Emmanuel III, to reward soldiers deployed to the colony of Libya. The order had fallen into abeyance by 1943, when Allied forces conquered the colonies of Italian North Africa.

The various degrees of the order, with limits to their number, were as follows:

Ribbon	Class (English)	Full title in Italian	Limit
	1st Class / Knight Grand Cross	Cavaliere di Gran Croce dell'Ordine coloniale della Stella d'Italia	4
	2nd Class / Grand Officer	Grande Ufficiale dell'Ordine coloniale della Stella d'Italia	7
	3rd Class / Commander	Commendatore dell'Ordine coloniale della Stella d'Italia	20
	4th Class / Officer	Ufficiale dell'Ordine coloniale della Stella d'Italia	50
	5th Class / Knight	Cavaliere dell'Ordine coloniale della Stella d'Italia	150

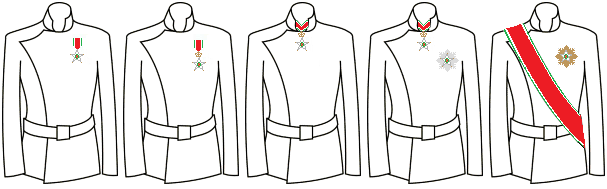
Wearing style of the insignia of the various classes of the Colonial Order of the Star of Italy.

== See also ==
- List of Italian orders of knighthood
- Order of the Roman Eagle
