= Commander-General of the Carabinieri =

The Commander-General of the Carabinieri (Comandante generale dell'Arma dei Carabinieri) is the head of the Carabinieri, the Italian Gendarmerie. He is usually chosen by decree of the president of the republic, nominated by the Minister of Defence (Italy) (who is seen as the head of Defense), and with the approval of the Council of Ministers (Italy),

From November 15, 2024, the position was held by Army Corps General Salvatore Luongo.

Rank Insignia of the Commander-General

Flag of the Commander General of the Carabinieri

== Rank Configuration ==
The rank configuration of the Commander-General of the Carabinieri, and in general, of Chief of Staffs of the Army, the Navy, and of the Air Force, is governed in Title III, Chapter III, Section III (in Articles 32, 33, and 34) of an order passed on March 15, 2010, or from "The Code of Military Order".

Rank Configuration di capo of the Chiefs of the Armed Forces and of the Commander-General of the Carabinieri Corps.

1. The Chiefs of the Italian Army, of the Italian Navy, and of the Italian Air Force are officers of their respective branches of the military that act on their appointment, holding the rank of Army corps general, Squadron admiral, Generale di squadra aerea in permanent service; Commander-General of the Carabinieri at the time of service holds the rank of Army Corps General in permanent service. These aforementioned military leaders:

a) Are nominated by decree of the president of the Republic, with the deliberation of the Council of ministers, and proposed by the Minister of Defense, the leader of national defense; b) Depend on the Chief of Staff of Defense; the Commander-General, limiting to the tasks of the Carabinieri. c) Within their respective force, their hierarchical rank is above all general officers and admirals.

2. The Chiefs of the Armed Forces and the Commander-General of the Carabinieri, in case of absence, impediments, or vacancy of his role, can be replaced by the general officer or admiral appointed to his respective position.

— Code of Military Order, Legislative Decree 15 March 2010, n. 66, article 32, concerning "Code of Military Order"

Its attributes in operational, training, and technical logistics are regulated in article 164 of this legislative decree, while those concerning recruitment, statuses, progress through ranks and employment, are regulated in article 165. Article 166 contains matters of finances and administration, and internationally in Article 167.

== See also ==
- Carabinieri
- Italian Minister of Defence
- Ministry of the Interior (Italy)
- Chief of the Defence Staff (Italy)
- List of chiefs of the Polizia di Stato
