= Monte Sant'Angelo massacre =

1944 attack in Arcevia in Marche, Italy

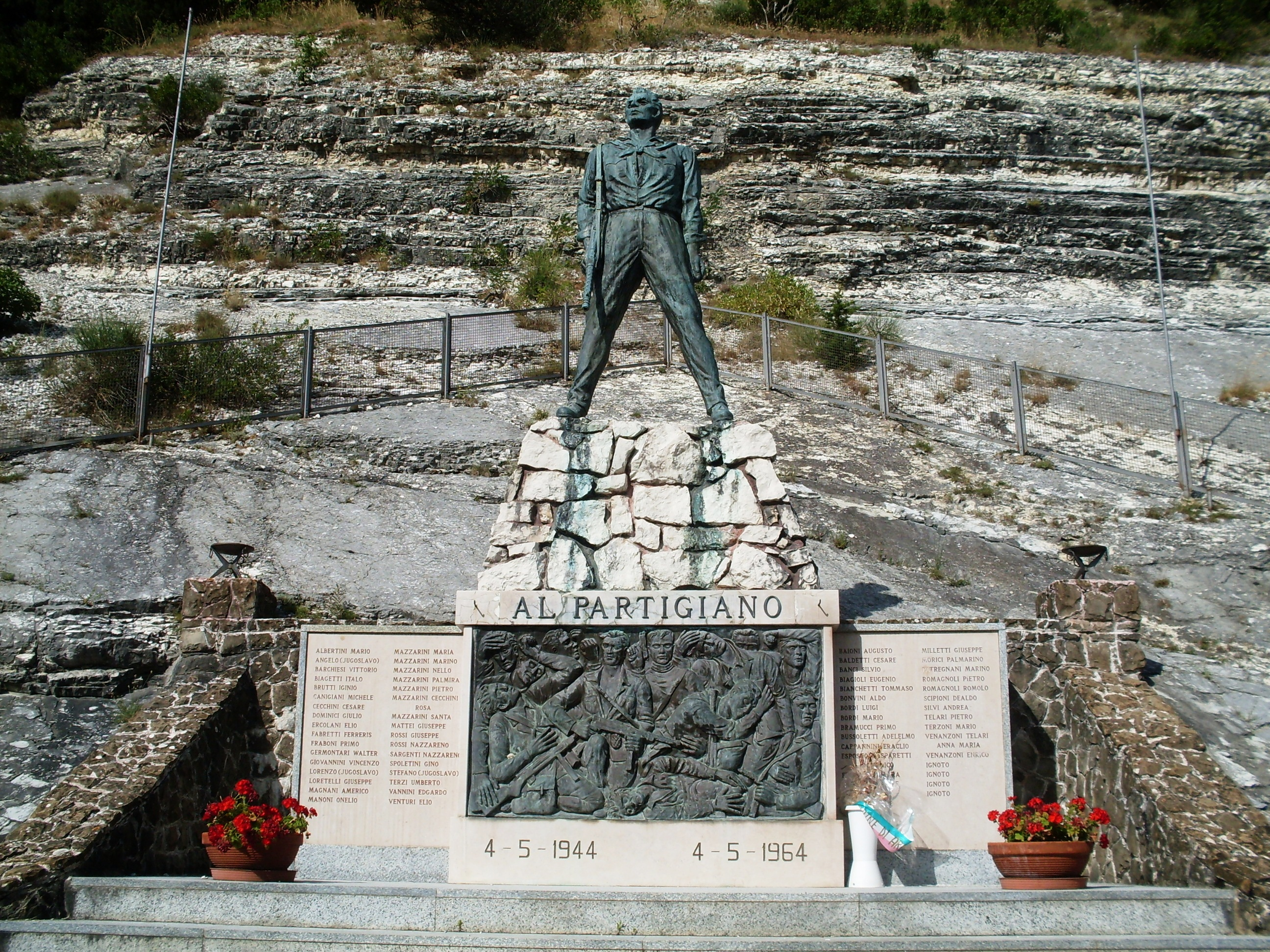
- Monument to the partisan in Arcevia
Date	4 May 1944
Location	Monte Sant'Angelo

The Monte Sant'Angelo massacre was a massacre perpetrated by Nazifascist forces on 4 May 1944, on Monte Sant'Angelo, in the municipality of Arcevia (AN), in which 63 civilians and Italian partisans were killed.

== Arcevia resistance ==
=== Contribution of the population to the partisan struggle ===
About 2500 citizens of Arcevia were called to arms in the last world conflict. Of these, 150 did not return, either killed in combat on various fronts or missing.

Following the general disbandment of the Italian army after the declaration of armistice by the Badoglio government on 8 September 1943, most of the military personnel serving in the metropolitan territory returned to their homes, despite the German occupation authorities having posted notices with death threats against those who deserted. Many young people, tired of the war whose aims they had never shared and moved by aversion to the German occupiers, preferred to join the Partisan formations that were being established. Dozens of foreign prisoners, especially Yugoslavs, who had escaped after 8 September from the Renicci internment camp, reached our territory on foot and found hospitality with some families. Many of these prisoners then went on to join the partisan formations in the mountains. If the cities of Arcevia and Ribnica (in Slovenia) are united by a Friendship Pact, officially consecrated in the twinning of 1972, it is precisely due to the partisan struggle waged together against the common Nazi-Fascist enemy and for the same ideals of freedom, social justice and peace.

Certainly, both the mountainous nature of this territory, mainly covered with oak and pine woods, and above all the patriotic and progressive traditions rooted in the population, dating back to the first Risorgimento and the years immediately following the end of the First World War, favored the rise and development of the partisan struggle. These sentiments of patriotism and political emancipation remained dormant, but not erased from the conscience of the people of Arcevia during the twenty years of fascism. It was precisely these characteristics that determined the full adherence of a large part of the population, and in particular of the peasants, to the struggle for National Liberation.

Soon, the farmhouses became barracks and headquarters for military and partisan commands; the stables, barns and huts were transformed into dormitories; their meager pantries became the main sources of sustenance. The peasants preferred to give what little they had to the partisans rather than deliver specific quantities of foodstuffs to the stockpiles, even at the risk of severe threats for their non-compliance. Because of this full support of the peasants for the resistance, dozens of farmhouses were set on fire, and many lost their lives for having given shelter to the partisans.

An example is the Mazzarini farming family, who had hosted the eponymous partisan group in their home at Monte Sant'Angelo. Their house was completely destroyed, and seven family members, including little Palmina, aged six, were massacred in the Nazi-Fascist roundup of 4/5/1944. Only the four children, Alderico, Anita, Chiara, Elvira, who were working for local families, survived. Another testimony is given by the Romagnoli peasant family of Ripalta. The father Pietro and the son Romolo were shot by the Germans for having given hospitality to the "Patrignani Marino" detachment, and their house was set on fire. Similarly, the spouses Telari Pietro and Venanzoni Maria of Avacelli were shot and their house destroyed; the sharecropper Baioni Augusto suffered the same fate. Other farmhouses that hosted partisans were those of Romani Massimo of S. Croce and Carbini Nazzareno of Castiglioni.

The farmhouse of the partisan Petrolati Ernesto of Magnadorsa was the headquarters of the partisan military command. Such intense bonds of friendship were established between the partisans and his family that the "Capoccia" (head of the family) was called "Mamma Teresa" by everyone. Another fixed location for partisan command meetings was the farmhouse of Profili Oreste of Castiglioni. Between the area commander, Quinto Luna, and Oreste himself, the same affectionate relationship that exists between two brothers was established.

While the support from the peasants is considered an important factor, other citizens, such as workers, artisans, entrepreneurs, professionals and students, also supported the partisan activities. Women also took part, particularly engaging in the important courier service to maintain connections between the various partisan groups and between these and the local military command.

In figures, the contribution of blood sacrifices and material damage suffered by Arcevia and the local population in the National Liberation War:

1. Partisan combatants and patriots recognized by the Marche Regional Commission n. 446;
2. Partisans killed in combat and shot in reprisal n. 68, of which n. 42 from Arcevia;
3. Young people from Arcevia taken prisoner in the roundup of 4/5/1944 and taken to the Sforzacosta concentration camp (C.P. n.56) n. 70, of which two died in concentration camps in Germany, and soldiers died in concentration camps in Germany n. 9;
4. Civilians killed as a result of aerial bombardments, artillery and mine explosions n. 18;
5. Partisans decorated with silver medal n. 8;
6. Houses burned in reprisal n. 15;
7. Enemy losses: killed in combat and executed n. 60;
8. War material captured from the enemy: muskets n. 62, machine guns n. 6, heavy machine guns n. 3, pistols n. 14, various ammunition n. 12,000;
9. Bridges destroyed n. 32.

=== Partisan activities ===
This part of the report is taken from the rosters of partisan commanders and political commissars, whose original texts are deposited at the Historical Archive of the Regional Institute for the History of the Liberation Movement of the Marche and at the Office for the Recognition of Qualifications and Rewards for Partisans of the Ministry of Defense. This text therefore represents a synthesis of the most important war actions that characterized the Arcevia partisan struggle, respecting the most precise chronological order of events and in light of direct testimonies from still living partisan protagonists.

Immediately after 8 September 1943, the first partisan nuclei soon emerged in Arcevia, and the National Liberation Committee was formed with the participation of representatives of the various anti-fascist parties then organized, chaired by a well-known anti-fascist and political persecutee, Mario Zingaretti, originally from Arcevia and displaced from Ancona at that time. The partisan formations operating in the municipal territory throughout the resistance period were:

- the "S. Angelo" detachment, commander Avenanti Attilio (Polli) and political commissar Renato Bramucci (Uliano);
- the "Patrignani Marino" detachment, commander Gino Lazzari (Leò) and political commissar Arnaldo Giacchini (Uliano);
- the "Alessandro Maggini" detachment, commander Domenico Biancini (Sirio) and political commissar Cornelio Ciurmatori (Bibì).

Furthermore, the following patriotic action groups operated in the territory:

- the G.A.P. of S. Mariano, commander Gino Sopranzetti;
- the G.A.P. of Castiglioni, commander Nerio Giovanetti;
- the G.A.P. of Loretello, commander Attilio Belardinelli.

The area command was formed by Quinto Luna (Simone), Alberto Galeazzi (Alba) and Alfredo Spadellini (Frillo), already a volunteer in Spain in the international brigades.

The first partisan actions were aimed at recovering weapons, assisting foreign prisoners who had escaped from concentration camps and displaced persons and supplying food for the population. On 24 December 1943, the first partisan grouping became operational at Monte Sant'Angelo, initially composed of 18 men, armed with muskets, hunting rifles and some hand grenades. On 20 January 1944, the group attacked the barracks of the Carabinieri and militiamen in Montecarotto, solely for the purpose of seizing weapons, but due to the commander's refusal, fire was opened and two militiamen were killed; two partisans were also wounded. After this action, the command of the "S. Angelo" group passed to partisan Domenico Biancini due to an illness of commander Attilio Avenanti.

On 2 February 1944, some partisans from the "S. Angelo" group joined the partisan formations from the Fabriano area to assault a train stopped at Albacina station, loaded with 720 young people, taken from various cities in Italy to be deported to Germany. A violent shootout ensued against the train's escort, and two partisans were killed in the fighting, but the operation succeeded in its aim of freeing those young people. Indeed, one of them, Bollati Luigi from Milan, later joined the partisan group. On 6 February 1944, the "S. Angelo" group went to the weapons and equipment depot of the fascist garrison of Arcevia and seized five muskets, various ammunition, blankets and coats. They also took several quintals of salt, most of which was distributed to the population. Also during this period, some fascist homes and a weapons depot at the Senigallia railway station were searched. This operation yielded the following spoils: 6 machine guns, 60 muskets, one heavy machine gun, 3 crates of hand grenades and various ammunition. With this war material, it was possible to better arm the "S. Angelo" group, which was continuously growing with new members.

After two attacks on the position held by the "S. Angelo" group by the militiamen of the Republican National Guard stationed in Cabernardi, on 17 April 1944, the fascist garrison guarding the sulfur deposit (previously owned by the Società Nazionale Industria Zolfi), in the valley west of the Case Biagio district, was assaulted. The surprise and good conduct led to complete success. The entire garrison, composed at that moment of 13 militiamen, surrendered. The hut that served as a dormitory for the garrison was burned; while a fascist militiaman wounded in the clash was hospitalized in Arcevia, the other militiamen were taken to Monte Sant'Angelo where they were held prisoner under strict surveillance. The spoils of war were abundant: 4 "Beretta" submachine guns, one machine gun, 7 muskets, half a crate of hand grenades, one crate of ammunition and a pistol. In the afternoon of the same day, about 50 armed fascists arrived in the Monte Sant'Angelo area to attack the group and free their imprisoned comrades. Alerted by the sentinels, the partisans prepared for a prompt defense by adopting the encirclement technique. After an hour and a half of shooting, the fascists disengaged and retreated in a hasty flight, taking some wounded with them; the partisans suffered no losses.

On 27 April 1944, along the Arcevia-Sassoferrato road, a fascist patrol on an "Alce" motorcycle was blocked. The two militiamen were taken prisoner and brought to Monte Sant'Angelo; the motorcycle, two submachine guns and a pistol were seized. On the same day, a fascist spy possessing a pistol was captured and executed. Practically the entire vast territory of the Municipality was under partisan control. In Arcevia and other localities of the Municipality, after more than twenty years, 1 May, the symbolic workers' holiday, could be celebrated with songs and flag waving.

This situation had so alarmed and panicked the fascist garrison of Arcevia, the Republican authorities, and the civilian collaborators of the Nazi-Fascists that it led them to request reinforcements from the German SS for an exemplary and radical lesson to the partisan forces. Indeed, the rumor of an imminent enemy roundup was becoming increasingly persistent. The partisan command, in anticipation of this roundup, gave the order to the "S. Angelo" group to divide into groups and proceed in three different directions; one to San Donnino di Genga, another to Avacelli di Arcevia and the third to Colonnetta di Serra de' Conti. Only a few partisans were to remain at Monte Sant'Angelo to guard the fascist prisoners, ready to flee at the first signs of enemy action.

But a disconcerting event occurred in the late evening of 3 May 1944. A partisan formation, coming from Vaccarile di Ostra under the command of Manoni Onelio, a former Carabinieri brigadier, as part of a reorganization of all local partisan forces, was supposed to reach San Donnino, but upon arriving by truck at Montefortino, decided to stop at Monte Sant'Angelo, where it joined the few partisans who had remained guarding the fascist prisoners and, due to the fatigue of the journey, decided to spend the night in the farmhouse. At dawn on 4 May 1944, about two thousand German and Fascist soldiers with armored cars, cannons, mortars and flamethrowers assaulted Monte Sant'Angelo. Near the farmhouse, a bloody and unequal battle broke out between the overwhelming enemy forces and the few partisans who fired until the last shot. Only some partisans managed to break the encirclement and escape to safety; all the others, including seven members of the Mazzarini family and three Yugoslav partisans, lost their lives in the fighting. Not even little Palmina, held tightly in her mother's arms, was spared from the Nazi-Fascist fury. In the fury of the battle, the two deserter militiamen, previously serving in Cabernardi, who had surrendered to the partisans with their weapons the previous April, also died. Indeed, among the charred remains in the Mazzarini farmhouse, their four boots were found.

After completing the massacre at Monte Sant'Angelo, the Nazi-Fascists moved to Montefortino, hunting partisans house to house. Eleven partisans were captured, who, after being denounced, pricked with bayonets, tortured and some even castrated, were shot and their bodies thrown into a ditch. Another seven partisans, captured in various locations in the municipal territory, were taken to the foot of the walls of San Rocco di Arcevia and, in the presence of the forced citizenry, were shot.

In the following days, another seventy young people from Arcevia were taken prisoner and brought to the Sforzacosta concentration camp (Macerata). Many of them managed to escape, but the others were taken to concentration camps in Germany. Two of them: Carboni Luigi and Santini Giorgio died in the Nazi camps.

Acts of true heroism accompanied these tragic events. A spinner, Armanda Grandini, from the high window of the old spinning mill, located above the walls of San Rocco, loudly shouted "murderers" towards the execution squad. The partisan Marino Patrignani, before being shot, took off his shoes and threw them at the execution squad, shouting: "Long live free Italy." The partisan Eraclio Cappannini, before getting on the truck that would transport him to the place of execution, picked up a piece of paper from the ground, where he wrote a moving letter to his parents. Remo Latini, in the imminence of the execution, declared to the confessor Don Filippo Neri: "I forgive everyone, even my tormentors." This young man joined the partisan formations to avoid following his father in his chicken-thieving activities. It was his own father who reported him and had him captured by the fascists.

The historical analysis of the available documentation and testimonies can lead to the interpretation of this tragic event as follows: on the one hand, the confidence of the partisan forces in controlling the territory (to which, for example, the prefectural commissioner also had to submit), and on the other hand, the underestimation of the danger posed by the action of the German army retreating from the south of the Marche, which, aided by the most tenacious supporters of the regime, tended to scorch the earth behind it.

The Nazi-Fascist roundups caused a deep sense of dismay and bitterness among the partisans due to the loss of so many comrades in struggle, but certainly not despair and surrender; on the contrary, a strong will to continue the struggle to the end. Indeed, on 17 May 1944, all surviving partisans went to the Fugiano bush, located between Castiglioni and Avacelli, and there, together with the area commanders, it was decided to create two new partisan formations: the "Patrignani" detachment and the "Maggini" detachment.

The guerrilla warfare thus soon resumed with greater impetus, with more rapid movements, and with more effective blows inflicted on the enemy. A secret document of the German army found on a soldier killed in combat by the partisans of Montefeltro (Urbino) testifies to the resumption of the partisan struggle. In this document, the main road leading from the coast to Arcevia is indicated with a continuous red line to be traversed only with armed escort. On 25 May 1944, the Maggini detachment, along the Montale-Barbara road, blocked a bus transporting rounded-up young men who were liberated, and the militiaman accompanying them, a father of six children, was disarmed and released. On 30 May 1944, the two detachments, the "Maggini" and the "Patrignani," with the G.A.P. of Castiglioni, occupied Serra de' Conti. The Carabinieri of the station were disarmed; a fascist spy was executed and a four-arch bridge in Piana along the Serra de' Conti-Senigallia road was blown up. On 1 June, the "Patrignani" detachment near Montale stopped the infamous militia lord, Vito Cappellini from Fano, who was passing in his car, and he was executed. On 3 June, in Colonnetta, the "Patrignani" partisans opened fire on the commissioner of Arcevia, Giorgetti and his escort. But due to a jammed machine gun, Giorgetti managed to get out of range and escape, but the four militiamen of his escort remained on the ground. After a few days, the partisan Baldetti Cesare was killed in reprisal. On 5 June, the partisans of the two detachments occupied the Municipality of Genga; telegraph and telephone communications were interrupted, and near the railway station, fire was opened on a car with two German soldiers on board, one of whom was killed and the other seriously wounded. In the operation, a Luger and two pistols were stolen.

In the following days, several road bridges were blown up with dynamite to make troop movements and enemy retreats more difficult along the Arcevia-Jesi, Arcevia-Senigallia, Arcevia-Serra San Quirico, Arcevia-Fabriano, Arcevia-Pergola roads.

On 10 June, the "Patrignani" detachment, alerted by a courier about the enemy's passage, pursued the retreating German troops along the Ripalta-Castelleone di Suasa road, but due to the onset of night and the impossibility of establishing contact with the enemy, it was decided to suspend the pursuit. On the way back, at the squeak of a cart and the sound of a horse's hooves, fire was opened. In the ensuing shootout, two German soldiers were killed, but the horse survived without even a scratch. This strange event could have happened because the horse at the first shots turned back and returned to its stable from which it had been taken a few hours earlier by the two German soldiers who now lay dead in the cart.

On 12 and 13 June, the "Maggini" detachment occupied the main towns of Barbara and Castelleone di Suasa. After cutting the telephone cables, the Carabinieri were disarmed, and the following spoils were obtained: 8 muskets, 20 magazines and several hand grenades. On 15 June, the men of the "Maggini" detachment went to the Cabernardi mine, disarmed the militiamen of that station, and removed a considerable quantity of explosives from the depot. On 22 June, Sergeant Aldo Mantovani (of the 52nd public order company of Rovigo, stationed in Cabernardi) was mortally machine-gunned by a partisan patrol while walking across agricultural land in the Felcine district, returning from the Sniz mine east of Camarano and Caparucci.

On 23 June, the partisans of the two detachments, in a combined action positioned on two different heights, opened fire on a retreating horse-drawn German column. The battle lasted about half an hour with the following result: eight German soldiers and two horses killed, others wounded; much war material destroyed or irrecoverable due to a cart overturning into a ravine. On the partisan side, a machine gun was lost, blown up by a bomb explosion. On 25 June, the two detachments, in collaboration with the G.A.P. of Castiglioni, near the locality "Croce del Moro", set an ambush for a retreating German cavalry unit. In the ensuing shootout, the Germans lost four horses and abandoned a prolonged 149mm cannon, which was then rendered unusable due to the impossibility of transporting it.

On 2 July, partisans from the "Patrignani" detachment opened fire on a motorcycle with a sidecar carrying three Germans along the Arcevia-Conce road. The three Germans were killed, and the following spoils were seized: two Lugers and one pistol. On the night between 13 and 14 July 1944, the "Patrignani" detachment, in collaboration with the G.A.P. of San Mariano, occupied the town of Arcevia, blocking all access roads. Following instructions from the area military command and the CLN, they took thirteen people from their homes who were accused of spying for the Germans, and in "Madonna dei Monti", after a summary trial, they were executed by firing squad. The Allied front was advancing north, but the war continued.

On the afternoon of 14 July, two Germans on a motorcycle were intercepted on the Montefortino-Palazzo road, attempting to seize foodstuffs from civilians: they were attacked and disarmed. The seized material was returned to its rightful owners. The revolvers and motorcycle were made available to the men of the Sant'Angelo detachment. On 29 July 1944, the retreating Germans, with artillery pieces positioned along the Piticchio Hill, shelled the hamlet of Castiglioni, causing five deaths and several injuries. On 30 July, also on the Piticchio Hill, a farmer killed a German soldier responsible for raping a woman. In reprisal, over a hundred hostages, including elderly people, women and children, were enclosed in a hut and threatened with death if the person responsible for killing the German soldier did not present himself within twenty-four hours. Fortunately, this slaughter did not take place because the Allied artillery, which had already liberated Montecarotto, upon partisan reports, began shelling the positions where the Germans were camped, forcing them to flee.

Liberation was near: by order of the German Command, two municipal notes dated 21 July and 1 August ordered all owners of cars, trucks, motorcycles, bicycles, tires, gasoline, benzol and lubricating oil to immediately hand over these materials. The notices menacingly concluded that "all those who, following a home search, are found in possession of said materials will be executed by firing squad." Finally, on 9 August, when the town of Arcevia had already been liberated by the Maiella Brigade, units of the Nembo and Polish troops, in Ripalta di Arcevia, a farmer, Cecchini Cesare, grandfather of the former bishop of Fano, was killed by the Germans because he was responsible for indicating to the Allied troops the position of mines placed in the field he cultivated. The collaboration of the partisans with the Allies also manifested itself in the demining of roads as soon as the Germans retreated from their positions and with the precise indication of German retreat locations for timely and targeted bombardments.

With the liberation of Arcevia, which occurred precisely on 5 August 1944, the contribution of its people to the National Liberation struggle did not end. Many partisans from Arcevia decided to continue fighting until the complete liberation of the homeland, enlisting in the reconstituted Italian army (CIL) units, and particularly in the Maiella Brigade, which had participated in the liberation of Arcevia. On 20 August 1944, the "S. Angelo" platoon was formed in memory of the martyrs from Arcevia. This platoon took part in all the battles that distinguished the Maiella Brigade for courage and heroism: from the liberation of Pesaro on 2 September 1944, to the liberation of Castel S. Pietro (Bologna) on 21 April 1945. Two other partisans who had fought in our formations, Luciano La Marca and Franco Lalia, died in the battles of the Maiella Brigade.

The Maiella Brigade was disbanded on 15 July 1945, and with its disbandment, Arcevia's contribution to the National Liberation struggle ended: the commander of the Sant'Angelo platoon received two official certificates of esteem and praise for his entire group of patriots from the Commander of the 3rd Company of the Maiella Brigade.

== From liberation to the constitution ==
The last war news in the Arcevia territory is from 12 August 1944 and concerns the Nidastore area, located at the extreme north of the municipality. The retreating Germans fired their last furious artillery shots, also hitting the medical clinic and the nursery school of the "Uomini di Nidastore" Institution: meanwhile, news arrived that a young farmer had been seriously hit by the explosion of a mine that had crushed his leg. Disregarding all danger, two nuns, Sister Francesca and Sister Giustina, set off to provide aid and traveled about two kilometers amidst the explosions of 45 shells: despite this, and even opposing a German patrol that tried to stop them, they managed to accomplish their generous mission.

The return to normal daily life also concerned the work of farmers and miners. The threshing of wheat in the summer of 1944 was a real concern for the farmers of the area. The harvest itself had not been easy due to the disintegration of family units, the inclemency of the weather and the passage of armies, always accompanied by inevitable looting and destruction. In addition to these concrete difficulties, the farmers feared that once threshed, the wheat could become easy prey for German requisitions, and so they preferred to postpone threshing until after the German retreat. Simultaneously, while the partisan commanders, to save the wheat, pressed for the threshing machines not to leave the warehouses and not to appear in the farmyards, the Prefect of Ancona, on the other hand, urged the prefectural commissioners and the GNR garrison commands to ensure that all owners of threshing machines would quickly make them efficient for threshing and declare their location. Immediately after Liberation, in many areas even in September, the farmers managed to thresh. The fuel for these works was supplied by the Allied army. Concerns about the quality of the harvest were disproved by the facts: despite the delay and the rains, the production was abundant and of good quality.

In September 1944, the Cabernardi sulfur mine resumed operations after the partial destruction of the plants caused by the Germans, not without tensions because many miners were denied work for not having responded to the call to arms. After twenty years of fascist dictatorship, there was a protest demonstration, the first of a very long series. About fifty unemployed miners besieged the Directorate's premises where the director, engineer Zamboni, had barricaded himself, quickly succeeding in being rehired in the mine. The recovery was very gradual, and normality was only restored at the beginning of August 1945 after the reconstruction of all external plants and the completion of the power line that supplied the mine. The 1945 production was consequently very low, melting barely 5000 tons of sulfur between Cabernardi and Percozzone. Only in 1946, in the climate of full reconstruction that the entire country was undergoing, did the Cabernardi mine return to its normal production.

On the very day of the Liberation of the capital of Arcevia, the head of the Municipality, Giuseppe Severini, in a manifesto addressed to the population, thus announced his appointment: "[...] Having achieved the Liberation of our municipality by the victorious Allied troops, with the consent of the competent military occupation authorities, I assume, as a member of the national liberation committee, the office and functions of head of the municipality [...]". Subsequently, appointed by the prefect, as the highest territorial administrative authority, the mayors Giuseppe Terni from 16 December 1944 and Amedeo Pianelli from 11 March 1945, would be appointed.

Finally, the rules of representative democracy were re-established, with parties able to resume their activities without prohibitions. On 18 March 1946, municipal elections were held with - for the first time in Italy - the system of universal suffrage, meaning with the right to vote for all adult male and female citizens. In Arcevia, the winning list included those parties - communists, socialists, republicans and other minor ones - that openly declared themselves in favor of the republic: the electoral campaign took place in a very passionate atmosphere and with great participation of citizens in rallies and various party meetings. Out of 7788 registered voters, 6561 went to vote: adopting the majority system, the so-called "social-communist" list obtained 4476 votes and 24 councilors (Francolini Leone, Pianelli Amedeo, Giorgi Giulio, Giovannetti Sesto, Cenci Luigi, Antonelli Armando, Boria Achille, Olivi Amilcare, Silvi Gherardo and Angelelli Livio for the Socialist Party; Ceccarelli Ruggero for the Demolabour Party; Ginesi Attilio for the Republican Party; Montanari Quinto, Avenanti Attilio, Bomprezzi Sabatino, Petrolati Ernesto, Agostinelli Vinnico, Quattrini Vincenzo, Landi Primo, Giacchini Arnaldo, Rossi Torindo, Mancinelli Dante, Paolinelli Angelo and Casoli Giovanni for the Communist Party), the Christian Democratic list obtained 1673 votes and six councilors (Simoncelli Giuseppe, Banci Tito, Villani Ezio, Meschini Dante, Armezzani Carlo and Pencarelli Angelo). On 7 April 1946, the first democratically elected municipal council after the end of fascism met: the socialist Leone Francolini became Mayor with 21 votes; the Junta was composed of five effective assessors (Arnaldo Giacchini, Attilio Avenanti, Torindo Rossi for the Communist Party, Attilio Ginesi for the Republican Party and Amedeo Pianelli for the Socialist Party) and two alternate assessors (Vinnico Agostinelli of the PCI and Sesto Giovannetti of the PSI).

On 2 June 1946, a referendum was held to choose between monarchy and republic as the institutional form of the State, and elections were held to choose the members of the Constituent Assembly, who were to draft the text of the Constitution, which would come into force on 1 January 1948. In Arcevia, the result of the referendum on the institutional form was as follows:

- Valid votes for the Republic: 5342, equal to 81%;
- Valid votes for the Monarchy: 1291, equal to 19%.

Out of a total of 7202 voters (equal to a very high turnout of 94% of voters), there were also: 479 blank ballots, 88 null ballots and 2 disputed votes not attributed to the Monarchy. This result for the Republic was well above both the regional result (+10%) and the national result (+26%). The highest percentage of votes in favor of the Republic was expressed in polling station no. 7 in Costa, where it reached 90% (it was precisely in the Costa territory that the Monte Sant'Angelo massacre took place).

In Arcevia, the result of the elections for deputies to the Constituent Assembly was as follows:

- Electors: 7697
- Voters: 7202, equal to 94%
- Valid votes attributed: 6469
- Blank ballots: 383
- Null ballots: 342
- Disputed and unassigned votes: 8
- Communist Party: 3092 (47.8%)
- National Democratic Union: 121 (1.9%)
- Republican Party: 347 (5.4%)
- Action Party: 59 (0.9%)
- Independent Democratic Union: 103 (1.6%)
- Socialist Party: 1264 (19.5%)
- Common Man's Front: 274 (4.2%)
- Christian Democratic Party: 1209 (18.7%)

== List of fallen ==
=== Fallen at Monte Sant'Angelo ===
- Albertini Mario
- Barchiesi Vittorio
- Biagetti Italo
- Brutti Igino
- Canigiani Michele
- Dominici Giulio
- Ercolani Elio
- Fabbretti Ferris
- Fraboni Primo
- Germontari Walter
- Giovannini Vincenzo
- Latieri Giuseppe
- Loretelli Giuseppe
- Magnani Americo
- Manoni Onelio
- Mazzarini Maria
- Mazzarini Marino
- Mazzarini Nello
- Mazzarini Palmira
- Mazzarini Pietro
- Mazzarini Cecchini Rosa
- Mazzarini Santa
- Mattei Giuseppe
- Rossi Giuseppe
- Rossi Nazzareno
- Sargenti Nazzareno
- Spoletini Gino
- Terzi Umberto
- Vannini Edgardo
- Venturi Elio
- Juraga Francesco (Frane) Yugoslav
- Juraga Stefano (Stipe) Yugoslav
- Martinovic Lorenzo (Lovro) Yugoslav
- Angelo (from Campobasso

=== Executed by firing squad at Montefortino ===
- Biagioli Eugenio
- Bianchetti Tommaso
- Bordi Luigi
- Bordi Mario
- Bramucci Primo
- Bussoletti Adelmo
- Esposto Gasparetti Domenico
- Lenci Giuseppe
- Mancini Giulio
- Silvi Andrea
- Terzoni Mario

=== Executed by firing squad in Arcevia ===
- Capannini Eraclio
- Latieri Giuseppe
- Latini Remo
- Milletti Giuseppe
- Morici Palmarino
- Patrignani Marino
- Scipioni Dealdo

=== Executed by firing squad in Reprisal ===
- Baioni Augusto
- Baldetti Cesare
- Bonvini Aldo
- Cecchini Cesare
- Romagnoli Pietro
- Romagnoli Romolo
- Telari Venanzoni Annamaria
- Telari Pietro
- Venanzoni Enrico

=== Partisans of the XV Sant'Angelo Platoon in the Maiella Brigade ===
- Lalia Franco
- La Marca Luciano

=== Deported to concentration camps in Germany ===
- Carboni Luigi
- Santini Giorgio, son of Mario Santini
- Romani Gualtiero

=== Fallen due to various causes ===
- Banci Silvio, deceased due to a mine explosion
- Emma Latini in Ercolani, deceased due to a mine explosion
- Firsova Tamara, Russian, deceased due to illness

=== Fallen on the night of 14 July 1944 ===
- Maria Teresa Podesà, 63 years old
- Anita Poiani, 53 years old
- Teresa Togni, 51 years old
- Bianca Poiani, 45 years old
- Ada Moriconi, 35 years old
- Nunzia D'Oca, 25 years old
- Pietro Paggi, 77 years old
- Nazareno Pandolfi, 73 years old
- Giuseppe d'Oca, 64 years old
- Mario Santini, 61 years old
- Carlo Speranzini, 55 years old
- Federico Romei, 50 years old
- Giovambattista Ielapi, 29 years old

== Bibliography ==
- Antifascism and Resistance in the Marche, Consiglio della Regione Marche, 1974, pp. 191
- Movimento operaio e Resistenza a Fabriano 1884-1944. Urbino: Arfalìa. 1976. p. 194.
- Resistenza e Liberazione nelle Marche-Atti del I convegno di studio nel XXV della Liberazione. Urbino: Arfalìa. 1973. p. 500.
- A. N.P. I. Ancona, La Resistenza nell'anconitano. Dalle prime lotte antifasciste alla Liberazione, ANPI, Ancona, 1963, pp. 413
- Adua Armezzani, Tesi di laurea, L'Amministrazione democratica e popolare di Arcevia dalla Liberazione - 5 agosto 1944 - al 1960, Università degli Studi di Urbino-Facoltà di Magistero-Corso di laurea in pedagogia, Anno Accademico 1978–79
- Wilfredo Caimmi |author2=Alfredo Antomarini |wka=Wilfredo Caimmi |title=Ottavo chilometro. Memorie di vita partigiana nelle Marche |publisher=Il lavoro editoriale |location=Ancona |year=1995
- Wilfredo Caimmi (1997). Marciavamo con l'animo in spalla - Raccolta di racconti. Ancona: A.C.Remel. p. 313.
- Wilfredo Caimmi (2002). ...Con la pazienza degli alberi millenari. Ancona: Centro Culturale "La Città Futura". p. 334.
- Cornelio Ciarmatori (detto Bibi) (1976). Morire a maggio - Racconti partigiani. Urbino: Argalìa editore. p. 229.
- Cornelio Ciarmatori (detto Bibi) (1975). Arcevia e la sua valle nella Resistenza. Jesi: Arti Grafiche Jesine. p. 242.
- Comune di Arcevia (1989). 45º anniversario dell'eccidio di Monte S.Angelo e della Liberazione. Arcevia: Tipografia arceviese. p. 22.
- Alberto Galeazzi (Alba) (1975). Gemellaggio Arcevia-Ribnica. Jesi: Nuova Grafica. p. 137.
- Alberto Galeazzi (Alba) (1980). Resistenza e contadini nelle carte di un partigiano (1919-1949). Urbino: Argalìa. p. 282.
- Paolo Giannotti (a cura di), I giornali clandestini delle Marche (1943–1944), Consiglio della Regione Marche, Urbino, 1975
- Laboratorio di didattica della storia di Arcevia, La staffetta della memoria, racconti inediti
- P. Magnarelli; M. Pacetti; P. Sabbatucci Severini; A. Trento (1979). Aspetti della società marchigiana dal Fascismo alla Resistenza. Urbino: Argalìa Editore. p. 502.
- Piero Malvezzi (2002). Giovanni Pirelli (ed.). Lettere di condannati a morte della Resistenza italiana. Turin: Einaudi. pp. XVI-356.
- Franco Matacotta, Fisarmonica rossa, Quattroventi, Urbino, 1980
- Michele Millozzi (1974). Le Origini del fascismo nell'Anconetano. Urbino: Argalìa. p. 163.
- Vittorio Paolucci, La Repubblica sociale nelle Marche, Argalìa, Urbino, 1973, pp. 437
- Vittorio Paolucci (1982). La stampa periodica nella Repubblica sociale. Urbino: Argalìa. p. 243.
- Provincia di Ancona – Comune di Arcevia, Nel ventennale della Resistenza 1944/1964, Tipografia arceviese, Arcevia, 1964, pp. 11
- Scuola elementare Arcevia, Il profumo del tempo – I bambini raccontano i nonni, Circolo Didattico di Arcevia, Arcevia, 1995, pp. 71
- Aldo Severini; Associazione nazionale partigiani d'Italia. Comitato provinciale di Ancona (1954). Duemila belve e un pugno di eroi. Ancona: Spoltore. p. 31.
- Angelo Verdini Partigiani, minatori, soldati, contadini, in Giorgio Pedrocco (edited by), Un mondo cancellato. Miniere e minatori a Cabernardi, Editrice fortuna, Fano 1995, pp. 72–78; Giorgio Pedrocco (edited by), Un mondo cancellato.
- Comitato per le Onoranze alle Vittime di Madonna dei Monti di Arcevia: La verità sull'eccidio di Madonna dei Monti di Arcevia - L'Ultima Crociata 1989
- Giampaolo Pansa (2010). I vinti non dimenticano. I crimini ignorati della nostra guerra civile. Milan: RCS Libri S.p.A. ISBN 9788858613030.
- Ruggero Giacomini; Alvaro Rossi (2012). Una donna sul monte. La partigiana Maria Rossini di Cabernardi e il mistero di militi scomparsi nella strage del Monte Sant'Angelo di Arcevia. Ancona: Affinità elettive. ISBN 9788873261902.
