= Alceo Ercolani =

Italian military and politician (1899–1968)

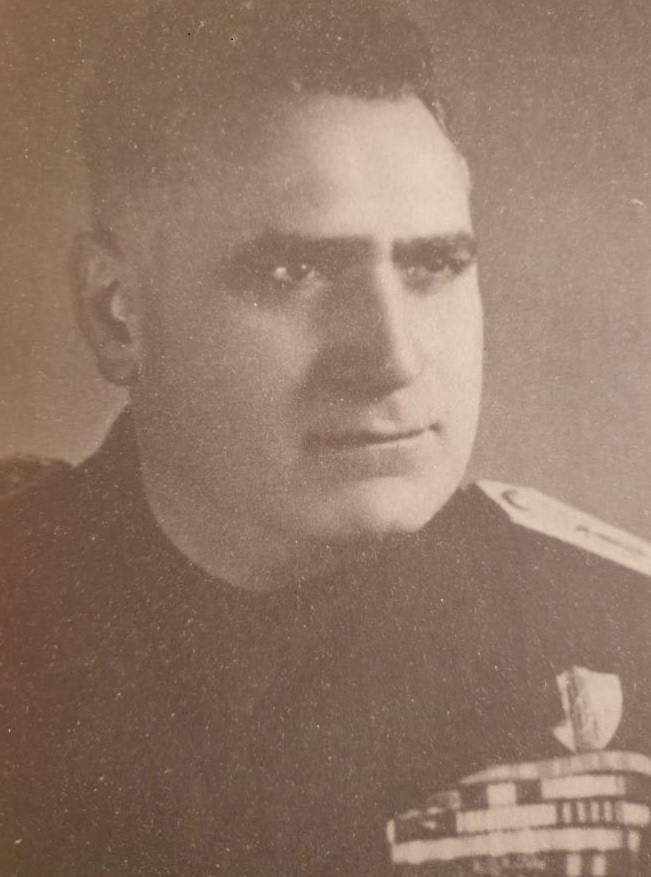

Member of the Chamber of Fasces and Corporations
- In office 28 March 1940 – 2 August 1943

Federal secretary of Treviso
- In office April 1940 – May 1941

Federal secretary of Rieti
- In office April 1943 – May 1943

Federal secretary of Cosenza
- In office May 1943 – July 1943

Prefect and Head of the Province of Grosseto
- In office 25 October 1943 – 14 June 1944

Personal details
- Born: 28 February 1899; Bomarzo, Province of Rome, Kingdom of Italy
- Died: 31 July 1968 (aged 69); Bomarzo, Province of Viterbo, Italy
- Political party: National Fascist Party, Republican Fascist Party

Alceo Ercolani (28 February 1899 – 31 July 1968) was an Italian soldier and politician, who served as member of the Chamber of Fasces and Corporations, federal secretary of Treviso, Rieti and Cosenza, and Prefect of Grosseto for the Italian Social Republic.

== Biography ==
Born in 1899 in Bomarzo to a family of agricultural entrepreneurs, he fought in the World War I by volunteering for the army in July 1916. After the war, he was sent to Libya and then to Albania, before being discharged in 1920. He later joined the colonial troops and from 1928 to 1933 was in Somalia; he then took part in the Ethiopian War, commanding a unit of natives. He fought in the Spanish Civil War between 1938 and 1939.

Very active politically, he joined the National Fascist Party in 1921 and was the founder of the Fascio in Bomarzo and inspector of the Fascist Italian Youth in Rome. On 28 March 1940, Benito Mussolini appointed him national deputy in the Chamber of Fasces and Corporations, which had replaced the Chamber of Deputies. From April 1940 to May 1941, he was the federal secretary of the party in Treviso.

In the autumn of 1941, he took part in the Russian campaign as a major in the 3rd Bersaglieri Regiment. Repatriated the following year for health reasons, he was decorated with the Silver Medal of Military Valor. He then served as federal secretary of Rieti (April-May 1943) and of Cosenza (May-July 1943). After the fall of Fascism, he was assigned to Busto Arsizio to command the 25th Bersaglieri Battalion, but abandoned the troops on 8 September at the news of the Armistice of Cassibile and reached Rome, where he joined the Republican Fascist Party.

On 26 September 1943, he became federal commissioner of the Republican Federation of Grosseto and the following month was appointed Head of the Province and therefore prefect of Grosseto. During his stay in Maremma, he actively and methodically engaged in the persecution of Jews in the province, organizing their deportation and the confiscation of their properties. On 28 November 1943, he set up a concentration camp in Roccatederighi, within the structure of the episcopal seminary, leased by Bishop Paolo Galeazzi.

On 25 October 1943, he ordered a roundup in the Santa Fiora area on Mount Amiata, aiming to capture some escaped British prisoners of war, which resulted in five arrests and the killing of farmer Pietro Nuti, accused of harboring the enemy. On 29 November, due to frequent Allied bombings on Grosseto, he ordered the transfer of the prefecture offices to the Monteverdi estate in Paganico.

Following the February 1944 decree, which provided for the death penalty for draft evaders and deserters, Ercolani began a zealous campaign of repression against those who did not respond to the call to arms of the Italian Social Republic and the families who assisted and sheltered them. Starting from 2 March, he intensified the roundup operations conducted by the National Republican Guard under the command of Ennio Barberini, focusing particularly on the southeastern area of the province. One of the most notorious operations was the one at Monte Bottigli, organized by Ercolani himself, in collaboration with Deputy Commissioner Liberale Scotti and Fascist triumvir Silio Monti: on the night between March 21 and 22, eleven young men were captured and sentenced to death in a show trial at the rural school of Maiano Lavacchio. Ercolani expressed satisfaction with the operation's success, but news of the massacre fueled discontent in the city, causing outrage among the population and even among the Fascists themselves.

On 8 June 1944, Ercolani abandoned Grosseto, which was about to be liberated by the Allies, and fled to Bardolino, in Veneto, where he was joined a few days later by what remained of the Republican militia from Grosseto. In early July, he was appointed president of the National Agency for Assistance to Refugees and the Protection of the Interests of the Invaded Provinces (ENAP) of the Italian Social Republic, based in Milan, a position he held until the end of the war.

Arrested, Ercolani was sentenced to thirty years in prison by the Court of Assizes of Grosseto. After an appeal to the Supreme Court of Cassation, a new sentence by the Court of Assizes of Perugia, pronounced in February 1949, reduced the sentence to 21 years. He was released on 19 May 1950, benefiting from parole.

He returned to his native Bomarzo, where he died on 31 July 1968.

== Sources ==
- Stefano Campagna; Adolfo Turbanti, eds. (2022). Antifascismo, guerra e resistenze in Maremma. Arcidosso: Effigi.
- Nicla Capitini Maccabruni (1985). La Maremma contro il nazifascismo. Grosseto: La Commerciale.
- Enzo Collotti (1999). Razza e fascismo. La persecuzione contro gli Ebrei in Toscana (1938-1943). Rome: Carocci.
- Marco Grilli (2014). Per noi il tempo s'è fermato all'alba. Storia dei martiri d'Istia. Arcidosso: Effigi.
- Simon Levis Sullam (2015). I carnefici italiani. Scene dal genocidio degli ebrei, 1943-1945. Milan: Feltrinelli.
- Luciana Rocchi (2002). La persecuzione degli ebrei nella provincia di Grosseto nel 1943-44. Grosseto: ISGREC.
- Andrea Rossi (2006). Fascisti toscani nella Repubblica di Salò 1943-1945. Pisa: BFS Edizioni.
