= Zenone Benini =

Italian Fascist politician (1902–1976)

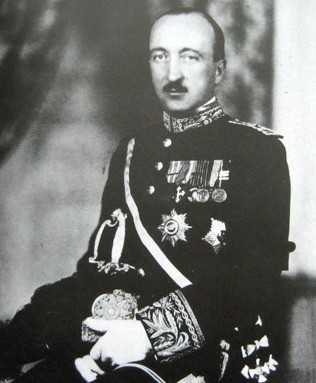

Minister of Public Works of the Kingdom of Italy
- In office 6 February 1943 – 25 July 1943
- Preceded by: Giuseppe Gorla
- Succeeded by: Domenico Romano

Undersecretary for Albanian Affairs of the Kingdom of Italy
- In office 18 April 1939 – 31 July 1941
- Preceded by: office created
- Succeeded by: office abolished

Member of the Chamber of Deputies of the Kingdom of Italy
- In office 28 April 1934 – 2 March 1939

Member of the Chamber of Fasces and Corporations
- In office 23 March 1939 – 5 August 1943

Personal details
- Born: 19 October 1902 Campiglia Marittima, Kingdom of Italy
- Died: 10 September 1976 (aged 73) Florence, Italy
- Party: National Fascist Party
- Awards: Order of the Crown of Italy; Colonial Order of the Star of Italy; Order of Saints Maurice and Lazarus

Zenone Benini (19 October 1902 – 10 September 1976) was an Italian industrialist and Fascist politician who served as the last minister of public works of the Mussolini Cabinet.

== Biography ==
Benini was born into a rich family of the Florentine bourgeoisie which owned a villa in the countryside, a straw hat factory and a metallurgical factory, the Pignone, located in Florence. He spent his early years in Florence but attended high school in Livorno, where he met Galeazzo Ciano, with whom he developed a lifelong friendship. During the First World War the family business increased its profits (the Pignone also produced armaments) and Benini became acquainted with war hero Costanzo Ciano, the father of his new friend. After the war he joined the National Fascist Party and during the Fascist period he became vice president of the Italian Corporation for the Iron and Steel Industry and president of the Union of Florentine Industrialists, while also taking the helm of the family business and sitting in the board of directors of companies such as SNIA Viscosa, Breda and La Fondiaria. In 1927 he obtained a degree in mathematics.

In 1934 he became a member of the Italian Chamber of Deputies, and in the following year he volunteered for the Second Italo-Ethiopian War, strengthening his ties with high-ranking Fascists such as Ciano and Alessandro Pavolini. In 1939 he became a member of the Chamber of Fasces and Corporations. In April 1939, on the recommendation of Galeazzo CIano, he was appointed Undersecretary for Albanian Affairs, a post created following the Italian occupation of Albania a few days before.

Following the outbreak of the Second World War he showed himself inclined towards neutrality, and for this reason he gradually lost the confidence of Mussolini, who in June 1941 dissolved his Undersecretariat. His political career apparently over, Benini returned to Florence to take care of the Pignone, but in February 1943 he was recalled by the Duce and appointed Minister of Public Works, a post he held until the fall of the regime on 25 July 1943. Benini had not been invited to the Grand Council of Fascism that had voted the motion of no confidence towards Mussolini on 25 July, however he was considered close to the positions of Ciano and Dino Grandi and thus suspected of treason by Fascist hardliners. After taking refuge in Maremma in October 1943, following the German occupation of Italy, he learned that he was wanted by the new government of the Italian Social Republic.

In November 1943, fearing reprisals against his family, he surrendered himself to the prefect of Grosseto, Alceo Ercolani; from there he was transferred first to the Murate prison in Florence and then to the Scalzi prison in Verona, where he met again Galeazzo Ciano, who was awaiting trial together with the other "traitors of 25 July". Benini was not charged in the trial, as he had not attended the Grand Council of Fascism that had voted for the end of the regime, had voluntarily surrendered to the RSI authorities and was considered a "small fish". He was thus released on 29 January 1944, also thanks to the help of his friend Pavolini, and returned to the Tuscan capital, where he later wrote a memoir about his imprisonment, Vigilia a Verona, which was published in 1949. In the following years, having lost control of the family business, which had been sold to the ENI group, he graduated in engineering, cultivated the hobby of gastronomy (he also wrote a recipe book in 1966, La cucina di casa mia) and taught mathematics in the schools of Castiglione della Pescaia, where he died at age 74 in 1976.
