= Cobolli =

Cobolli is an Italian surname from Istria. Notable people with the surname include:

- Flavio Cobolli (born 2002), Italian tennis player
- Giovanni Cobolli Gigli (born 1945), Italian lawyer and businessman
- Giuseppe Cobolli Gigli (1892–1987), Italian engineer and politician, grandfather of Giovanni
- Stefano Cobolli (born 1977), Italian tennis player and coach, father of Flavio
