= Ennio Barberini =

Italian military and politician (1897–1979)

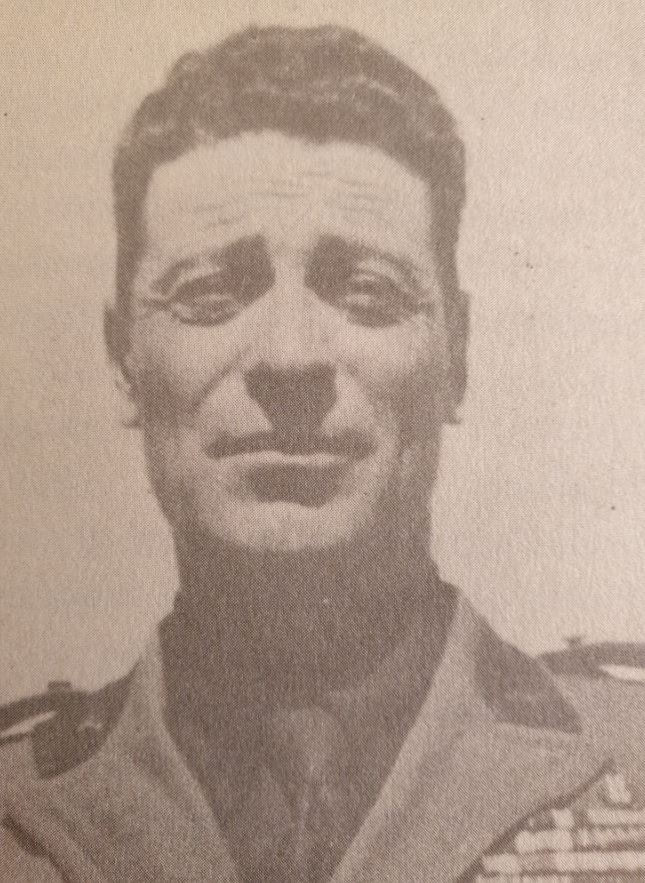

Member of the Chamber of Fasces and Corporations
- In office 9 February 1942 – 2 August 1943

Deputy Secretary of the National Fascist Party
- In office 9 February 1942 – April 1943

Personal details
- Born: 19 June 1897; Scarlino, Gavorrano, Province of Grosseto, Kingdom of Italy
- Died: 1979 (aged 81–82)
- Political party: National Fascist Party, Republican Fascist Party

Ennio Barberini (19 June 1897 – 1979) was an Italian military and politician, who served as member of the Chamber of Fasces and Corporations, and Deputy Secretary of the National Fascist Party. He then fought for the Italian Social Republic and was appointed commander of the National Republican Guard of Grosseto, Vicenza and Cremona in 1944–1945.

== Biography ==
Born in Scarlino in 1897, Ennio Barberini was the son of pedagogue Pietro Barberini (1846–1913), who founded the local library in 1877. He volunteered for military service during World War I and was appointed as an artillery officer. Captured in 1917, he was released at the end of the war.

A staunch supporter of the National Fascist Party from its early days, Barberini was an active squadrista and began his career in the Milizia Volontaria per la Sicurezza Nazionale (MVSN) in 1923. He participated in major MVSN expeditions, including those in Spain and Libya, where he commanded the II Legion, and in East Africa, where he distinguished himself in 1937 among the officers suppressing Ethiopian guerrillas.

On 9 February 1942, Barberini was appointed to the Chamber of Fasci and Corporations, which had replaced the Chamber of Deputies, and was named Deputy National Secretary of the party by Benito Mussolini. He served on the national council and directorate that Mussolini had established alongside Secretary Aldo Vidussoni, which included Ferdinando Mezzasoma, Augusto Venturi, Mario Farnesi, and Carlo Ravasio.

On 8 September 1943, the day the Armistice of Cassibile was announced, Barberini was in Toulon as an officer of the Militia's landing battalion group. Initially detained by the Germans, he was later released and allowed to return to Italy to fight for the Italian Social Republic (RSI). Barberini then joined the Republican Fascist Party and was appointed commander of the 98th Legion of the National Republican Guard, which operated in the province of Grosseto.

Barberini was a key organizer of the anti-partisan efforts in the Maremma region, and under his leadership, the Republican Fascist Legion quadrupled its ranks. Beginning on 2 March, he coordinated extensive raids in the southern territories of the province, leading nine companies from Grosseto, Siena, Orvieto, and Viterbo to intimidate the population and encourage enlistment in the RSI. On 10 March, he ordered the raids that led to the Scalvaia massacre.

On the night of June 9-10, Barberini abandoned Grosseto, which was on the brink of liberation by the Allies, leading a convoy of armored vehicles with prominent Grosseto officials and about 200 militiamen. Barberini fled to Bardolino in the province of Verona, was appointed commander of the Republican Militia in Vicenza in July, and later in Cremona.

At the end of the war, Barberini was arrested and tried in 1946. The Assize Court of Grosseto charged him with murder, collaboration with the Nazis, theft, and embezzlement, particularly in relation to the Maiano Lavacchio massacre, where eleven draft evaders were killed by the 98th Legion. Barberini was found not responsible for the massacre, as he was absent from Grosseto at the time, and the responsibility for the militia's involvement in the massacre was attributed to his deputy Angelo Maestrini. On 18 December 1946, the Court of Grosseto acquitted Barberini of murder and collaboration but sentenced him to six years in prison and a 4,000 lire fine for theft and embezzlement; he served only one year, benefiting from parole.

== Sources ==
- Stefano Campagna; Adolfo Turbanti, eds. (2022). Antifascismo, guerra e resistenze in Maremma. Arcidosso: Effigi.
- Nicla Capitini Maccabruni (1985). La Maremma contro il nazifascismo. Grosseto: La Commerciale.
- Marco Grilli (2014). Per noi il tempo s'è fermato all'alba. Storia dei martiri d'Istia. Arcidosso: Effigi.
- Mario Ragionieri (2009). 25 luglio 1943: il suicidio inconsapevole di un regime. Empoli: Ibiskos Risolo.
- Andrea Rossi (2006). Fascisti toscani nella Repubblica di Salò 1943-1945. Pisa: BFS Edizioni.
