= Maiano Lavacchio massacre =

1944 killings by the Republican fascists in Grosseto, Italy

Coordinates: 42°42′53.23″N 11°14′10.42″E

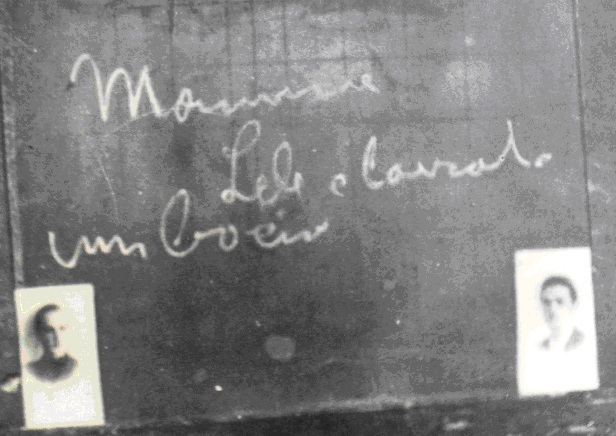
- The blackboard with the writing by Emanuele Matteini
- Location: Maiano Lavacchio, Magliano in Toscana, Province of Grosseto, Italy
- Date: 22 March 1944
- Target: Draft evaders
- Attack type: Massacre
- Deaths: 11
- Perpetrators: 98th GNR Legion, "Ettore Muti" Action Squad

The Maiano Lavacchio massacre took place on 22 March 1944, in the small rural locality of Maiano Lavacchio, in the countryside between Grosseto and Magliano in Toscana, not far from the village of Istia d'Ombrone. By order of the prefect and Head of the Province of Grosseto, Alceo Ercolani, a division of the National Republican Guard, together with some squadristi and local fascist leaders, rounded up, summarily tried, and executed eleven young men who were deemed guilty of not reporting for conscription to the Italian Social Republic and therefore were wanted as deserters.

== Background ==
Following the armistice of 8 September 1943, a group of young men, who had not enlisted in the army of the Italian Social Republic, took refuge in the hilly area of Monte Bottigli near Istia d'Ombrone to escape the Republican fascist militias during the winter. From time to time, some of them would return to the village to stock up on essential supplies, with the support of local residents.

Having learned of the presence of deserters in the countryside of Monte Bottigli, the prefect and Head of the Province, Alceo Ercolani, tasked a public safety officer, the Sicilian Lucio Raciti, with going to the nearby area of Maiano Lavacchio and infiltrating there to gather information. In this isolated area, there were several scattered farms (such as the Ariosti farm of the Biagi brothers, the La Sdriscia farm of the Matteini family, the Lavacchio farm of the Corsetti family, and the Appalto farm of Settimio Andrei and Teresa Biagi), which had become shelters for drifters and evacuees after the Allied bombings. On 19 March 1944, Raciti reached the Ariosti farm, pretending to be a veteran from the Russian campaign seeking shelter. He gained the trust of Angiolo Biagi, who introduced him to Mario Becucci, an evacuee from La Spezia who was wanted and seeking guidance to reach the huts in Monte Bottigli. Raciti spent the night at the Ariosti farm, sharing a room with Becucci, and the next day he left the farm to report the gathered information to Prefect Ercolani, who then initiated the roundup operations.

== Massacre ==
The roundup was organized by Ercolani himself, along with the Republican Fascist Party's triumvir Silio Monti and the deputy police chief Liberale Scotti. It took place during the night of March 21–22 and was executed by a group of about 140 men. The operation covered the entire rural area between Istia d'Ombrone and Maiano Lavacchio and involved a column of the 98th Legion of the National Republican Guard, led by Lieutenant Vittorio Ciabatti, the "Ettore Muti" action squad, commanded by Captain Michele De Anna, a group of public safety officers led by Commissioners Sebastiano Scalone and Pompilio Lorenzini, and some Carabinieri from the Monteverde Group. They were also joined by a German Feldgendarmerie unit, commanded by Lieutenant Colonel Müller, who had controlled the German armed forces in the province since 12 September 1943. The triumvir Monti and the prefectural commissioner of Grosseto, Inigo Pucini, were also present on the expedition.

Upon arriving at the Ariosti farm, the militias looted the house and beat the occupants, forcing Adelmo Biagi and the two Sardinian draft dodgers, Giovanni Piria and Giovanni Careddu, who were hiding there, to lead them to the huts at Monte Bottigli. More violence occurred at the Appalto, Lavacchio, and La Sdriscia farms, where some of the militia remained on guard to prevent anyone from running to warn the young deserters.

At dawn on 22 March 1944, just before 6 AM, a group of eleven people was captured at the Monte Bottigli huts. A twelfth man, Günther Frielingsdorff, known as Gino, a deserter from the Wehrmacht, was with the eleven youths but managed to escape during a moment of distraction by the fascists. He later joined the Monte Bottigli partisan band. Immediately after the capture, the German soldiers present left the operation, considering it concluded.

The group of fascists took the eleven young men, after beating them, to the Appalto farm in Maiano Lavacchio and began a summary trial in the local school. The duration of the "sham trial" was less than half an hour and ended with the death sentence for the eleven youths and the acquittal of the Sardinians Piria and Careddu, and Francesco Biagi and Ermenegildo Corsetti, who were charged with possession of rifles. The sentence was pronounced by the triumvir Silio Monti. Meanwhile, several alarmed people had reached the site, pleading for clemency for the youths, but were kept at a distance by the fascist militia. Dora Sandri, mother of the condemned Corrado and Emanuele Matteini, begged to be shot in place of her sons but was pushed away.

The execution squad was led by Inigo Pucini, the prefectural commissioner of Grosseto, and included at least Michele De Anna, Alfredo Del Canto, Lucio Raciti, Armando Gori, and Mario Giannini. The execution took place at 9:10 AM, in front of a hedge located opposite the Appalto farm.

Shortly before being murdered, while awaiting the verdict in a classroom, Emanuele Matteini wrote with chalk on the blackboard the words: "Mom. Lele and Corrado, a kiss" (Mamma. Lele e Corrado, un bacio). The blackboard, with the writing still intact, was later moved to the mayor's office in the Town Hall of Grosseto, where it is displayed.

Another young man, Antonio Brancati, before being executed, wrote a final letter addressed to his parents:

"Dearest parents, I do not know if it will be possible for me to see you again, which is why I am writing this letter. I have been condemned to death for not associating myself with those who want to completely destroy Italy. I swear to you that I have committed no crime other than loving Italy, our beloved and tortured homeland, more than they do. You can always say this aloud to everyone. If I die, I die innocent. I beg you to forgive me if I ever made you angry or disobeyed you; I was a boy then. Just pray for me to the good God. Do not worry too much. Do good to the poor for the salvation of my poor soul. I thank you for everything you have done for me and for my education. Let us hope that God gives you a just reward. Kiss all my brothers for me: Felice, Costantino, Luigi, Vincenzo, and Alberto, and my dear fiancée. Do not grieve and be brave; someone will avenge me. Reward and remember the Matteini family for the good they have done for me, for the motherly love they have shown me. I have always thought of you at every moment of the day. I am so sorry if we do not meet again on this earth; but we will meet again up there, in a more beautiful, just, and holy place. Always remember me. A big kiss, Antonio. Know that your Antonio will always think of you even after death and that he will watch over you from heaven."

== Victims ==
The eleven victims of the massacre are known as the "Martyrs of Istia" (martiri d'Istia), named after the village where many of them lived before evading military conscription.

- Mario Becucci, born on 4 June 1906, in La Spezia
- Antonio Brancati, born on 21 December 1920, in Catania
- Rino Ciattini, born on 7 November 1924, in Grosseto
- Alfiero Grazi, born on 26 August 1925, in Cinigiano
- Silvano Guidoni, born on 1 January 1924, in Istia d'Ombrone
- Corrado Matteini, born on 17 October 1920, in Istia d'Ombrone
- Emanuele Matteini, born on 12 December 1923, in Istia d'Ombrone
- Alcide Mignarri, born on 21 June 1924, in Istia d'Ombrone
- Alvaro Minucci, born on 16 October 1924, in Istia d'Ombrone
- Alfonso Passannanti, born on 28 September 1922, in Serre
- Attilio Sforzi, born on 7 February 1925, in Grosseto

== Aftermath ==
The bodies of the victims were initially ordered to be buried in a mass grave on site, but under the insistence of the parish priest of Istia d'Ombrone, Father Omero Mugnaini, the eleven bodies were brought to Istia d'Ombrone, where the priest defied orders and gave them a proper burial in the village cemetery. According to some witnesses, the priest opposed the fascists by exclaiming, "You take care of the living, I'll take care of the dead".

The successful outcome of the operation was well received by Prefect Ercolani, who expressed satisfaction and proposed rewards for the executors, describing the eleven draft evaders in an official report as an "armed gang".

"Penetrating the thick woods, Captain De Anna and Lieutenant Muller, along with their men, overcame many difficulties and managed to surprise the armed gang in their sleep. The fact that only one member of the gang managed to escape annihilation shows that the surprise was complete. The execution of the 11 individuals found with weapons highlighted the determination, coolness, and steadfast faith in fascism of all the leaders and members. Meanwhile, I express my deep appreciation and request the Commander of the G.N.R. to forward proposals for military valor awards for Captain De Anna, Lieutenant Muller, and anyone else deserving, along with the names of those members who particularly distinguished themselves, for a monetary reward."

However, the news of the massacre fueled unrest in the city, leading to indignation among the population. Consequently, there was an increase in draft evaders and young people joining the Resistance movement, with citizens becoming increasingly distrustful of the Republican fascist authorities. A division of the "Alta Maremma" partisan formation was named after Attilio Sforzi. The massacre also caused discontent among the fascists themselves. On 26 April 1944, at the assembly of the Republican Fascist Party in Grosseto, Ercolani's actions and those of the high-ranking officials were harshly criticized by some members, who deemed the massacre a political suicide. Following the complaints, fascist Vezio Vecchio was arrested for twenty days on charges of defeatism.

== Trial ==
=== Prosecutions ===
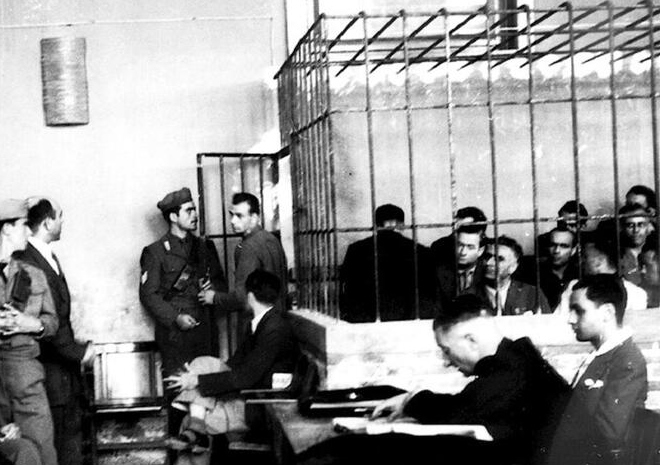
Trial in Grosseto

The first investigations into the responsibilities for the Maiano Lavacchio massacre began as early as the autumn of 1944 by the local National Liberation Committee. The trial, which consolidated all the investigations into the roundups that had occurred in the province, was initiated in June 1946 by the Special Section of the Assize Court of Grosseto and had the provincial head Ercolani and all the major Republican Fascist leaders on the defendants' bench.

The Court of Grosseto charged Alceo Ercolani, Ennio Barberini, Angelo Maestrini, and Generoso Pucci, respectively the Head of the Province, the commander and deputy commander of the 98th GNR Legion, and the triumvir of the Republican Federation, with the major responsibilities for the massacres that took place in the province of Grosseto. Specifically, for the Maiano Lavacchio case, it was demonstrated that the responsibility was entirely Italian, as it was established that the German unit had only taken part in the roundup; thus, full responsibility was attributed to all the main Grosseto fascist leaders, including deputy police chief Scotti, prefectural commissioner Pucini, Captain De Anna, Lieutenant Ciabatti, public safety commissioners Lorenzini and Scalone. Commander Barberini was found not responsible for the massacre as he was absent from Grosseto at that time and was judged only for other crimes; the participation of the Legion in the massacre was instead attributed to deputy commander Maestrini, former Federal Secretary and Podestà of Grosseto. Triumvir Monti was not tried as he had already died during a partisan's ambush on 28 May 1944, while the fugitives De Anna, Maestrini, and Scalone were tried in absentia.

=== Sentences ===
The verdict was issued on 18 December 1946: the Court sentenced Ciabatti, De Anna, Del Canto, Gori, Maestrini, Pucini, Raciti, and Scalone to death; Ercolani and Scotti to thirty years of imprisonment; Lorenzini to twenty-six years; Barberini and Giannini to six years of imprisonment and a fine.

The death sentences were never carried out, they were annulled and converted to life imprisonment by the Supreme Court of Cassation in 1948. All the responsible parties later benefited from amnesty and were released after a few years: Lorenzini, Gori, and Scotti in 1949, Ercolani in 1950, Pucini in 1951, Ciabatti, and Raciti in 1952, Del Canto in 1960. The fugitives Scalone and Maestrini, convicted in absentia, were later discovered to have already been deceased, both killed by partisans, respectively in Roccastrada in June 1944 and in Recoaro Terme in May 1945. Captain Michele De Anna, commander of the "Ettore Muti" squad in the Monte Bottigli operation, was the only one not to spend a single day in prison: having gone into hiding, he waited to benefit from the amnesty, which came on 29 August 1959; he later settled in Rome, where he practiced as a doctor. Inigo Pucini, who had commanded the execution squad, entered politics in Viterbo within the ranks of the Italian Social Movement.

== Commemoration ==
The first commemoration of the massacre took place on 22 July 1944, about a month after the liberation of Grosseto. The event was attended by a crowd of over 1,500 people, including all public officials, Prefect Adolfo De Dominicis, and members of the National Liberation Committee and the Allied Military Government. The official speech was given by lawyer Giovanni Magrassi, who was later elected to the Constituent Assembly. All eleven victims were later awarded the honorary title of partisans of the Monte Bottigli division, although this band was formed only after the massacre on 4 April 1944.

Six of the eleven victims (Ciattini, Minucci, Mignarri, Guidoni, and the Matteini brothers) are buried in the commemorative chapel located in the cemetery of Istia d'Ombrone. Shortly after the liberation, the remains of the other victims initially buried in Istia were returned to their places of origin: Becucci and Sforzi were transferred to the Sterpeto cemetery in Grosseto, Passannanti to Serre in Campania, while Grazi's remains were returned to Cinigiano; the Grazi chapel was frescoed by Günther Frielingsdorff, a painter and the only survivor of the massacre. The "martyrs of Istia" are also remembered on a plaque placed on the Town Hall of Cinigiano. Brancati's remains were returned to his hometown Ispica on 14 October 1967, where he is also commemorated with a plaque placed in August 1945. The letter he wrote to his parents shortly before being killed was published in the book Lettere di condannati a morte della Resistenza italiana ("Letters of Condemned to Death of the Italian Resistance") edited by Piero Malvezzi and Giovanni Pirelli.

At the rural school of Maiano Lavacchio, a small obelisk topped with a lantern was placed on 22 March 1964 for the massacre's twentieth anniversary. At the site of the execution, the Matteini family erected the Chapel of Our Lady of Sorrows (cappella dell'Addolorata), where a religious commemoration of the massacre is held every year on 22 March. A square in the historic center of Grosseto is dedicated to the "Martyrs of Istia". Brancati has a square and a sports field named after him in Ispica, while in 2001, a square in Serre was named after Passannanti. In 2014, the Grosseto municipal administration, headed by Mayor Emilio Bonifazi, named four streets in Istia d'Ombrone, after Guidoni, Mignarri, Minucci, and the Matteini brothers.

On 22 March 2023, the Casa della Memoria al Futuro ("House of Memory for the Future") was inaugurated at the rural school of Maiano Lavacchio, restored for the occasion by architect Edoardo Milesi. This study center is dedicated to the memory of the massacre and was created in collaboration with the ISGREC historical institute and the municipality of Magliano in Toscana. The "Tullio Mazzoncini" library is housed inside.

== See also ==
- List of massacres in Italy

== Sources ==
- Corrado Barontini; Fausto Bucci (1995). A Monte Bottigli contro la guerra: dieci "ragazzi" un decoratore mazziniano e un disertore viennese. Grosseto: ANPI.
- Stefano Campagna; Adolfo Turbanti, eds. (2022). Antifascismo, guerra e resistenze in Maremma. Arcidosso: Effigi.
- Nicla Capitini Maccabruni (1985). La Maremma contro il nazifascismo. Grosseto: La Commerciale.
- Francesco Chioccon (1964). Resistenza e alleati in provincia di Grosseto. Florence: Irst.
- Marco Grilli (2014). Per noi il tempo s'è fermato all'alba. Storia dei martiri d'Istia. Arcidosso: Effigi.
