= Niccolò Nicchiarelli =

Italian Blackshirt general

- Born: 26 August 1898; Castiglione del Lago, Kingdom of Italy
- Died: 1969 (age 71); Milan, Italy
- Military career
- Allegiance: Kingdom of Italy; Italian Social Republic
- Branch: Royal Italian Army; MVSN; Guardia Nazionale Repubblicana
- Rank: Brigadier General
- Commands: "Cacciatori del Tevere" Blackshirt Legion; 3rd Libyan Legion; 233rd Blackshirt Legion; 63rd Assault Blackshirt Legion "Tagliamento"; 1st Blackshirt Zone "XXI Aprile" Blackshirt Group
- Conflicts: World War I; Battles of the Isonzo; Battle of Caporetto; Pacification of Libya; World War II; Italian invasion of Egypt; Operation Compass; Italian campaign on the Easter Front; Italian occupation of Slovenia; Italian Civil War
- Awards: Silver Medal of Military Valor (twice); Bronze Medal of Military Valor; War Merit Cross (three times); Order of the Crown of Italy; Order of Saints Maurice and Lazarus; Colonial Order of the Star of Italy; Iron Cross second class; Eastern Medal; Wound Badge

Niccolò Nicchiarelli (28 August 1898 – 1969) was an Italian Blackshirt general during World War II. After the Armistice of Cassibile he joined the Italian Social Republic and became Chief of Staff of the Republican National Guard. He was also a member of the Chamber of Fasces and Corporations from 1939 to 1943.

== Biography ==
He was born in Castiglione del Lago, province of Perugia, in 1898, the son of Fabio Nicchiarelli and Candida Rosi. At age sixteen, he enlisted as a volunteer in the 1st Grenadiers of Sardinia Regiment during the First World War, receiving his baptism of fire on the Sabotin. Later, after attending a officers' course, he was assigned to the 37th Infantry Regiment of the Ravenna Infantry Brigade; in July 1916 he was seriously wounded during an assault on Monte Seluggio (Asiago plateau). On the following year, having been promoted to lieutenant, he was assigned to the 261st Infantry Regiment of the Elba Infantry Brigade, fighting on the Banjšice Plateau. On 27 October 1917 he was captured near San Pietro al Natisone during the battle of Caporetto, being then held as a prisoner of war in Grahovo, later in Rastatt and finally in Celle, where he remained until December 1918.

After being repatriated, he volunteered in 1919 for the pacification of Libya, fighting with the 241st Infantry Regiment, Teramo Infantry Brigade. An ardent nationalist since before the war, he immediately joined the nascent Fascist movement, becoming a squadrista; he participated in the March on Rome and in February 1923 he enlisted as seniore (major) in the newly formed Voluntary Militia for National Security (MVSN), first commanding the "Cacciatori del Tevere" Legion, and then an autonomous Blackshirt unit tasked with guarding the confinement colony in Lipari. At the same time, he graduated in law.

In 1935 he returned to Libya, assuming command of the 3rd Libyan Legion in Benghazi and serving as president of the Special Tribunal for Cyrenaica. He was also appointed federal secretary of the Benghazi section of the National Fascist Party, and as such became a member of the Chamber of Fasces and Corporations in 1939. After the Kingdom of Italy entered World War II on 10 June 1940, he participated in the conquest of Buq Buq and Sidi Barrani during the Italian invasion of Egypt in September 1941, at the head of the 233rd Blackshirt Legion (part of the 1st CC.NN. Division "23 Marzo"), for which he was awarded a Bronze Medal of Military Valor. He fought in North Africa until January 1941.

In July 1941 he was appointed commander of the 63rd Assault Blackshirt Legion "Tagliamento", part of the Italian Expeditionary Corps in Russia (CSIR), participating in the Axis advance into the Soviet Union, in the region between the Dnieper and the Don; in October 1941 he was awarded a Silver Medal of Military Valor for his role in the capture of Pavlohrad, and two months later he earned a silver medal for having repulsed a Soviet offensive in the so-called "Battle of Christmas". During this campaign he was promoted to console generale (Brigadier General). In June 1942 he was repatriated, suffering from frostbite, and assumed command of the 1st Blackshirt Zone in Turin; in May 1943 he became commander of the "XXI Aprile" Blackshirt Group in Kočevje, Slovenia.

At the proclamation of the Armistice of Cassibile, on 8 September 1943, Nicchiarelli was in Ljubljana, at the command of a blackshirt unit; he decided to continue the war alongside Germany, joining the Italian Social Republic when it was established later that month. In early 1944 he was appointed Chief of Staff of the Republican National Guard; he clashed with Alessandro Pavolini, founder of the Black Brigades, whom he accused of drawing away men from the GNR by promising a higher pay in the Black Brigades (Pavolini in turn accused Nicchiarelli of hampering the recruitment process of the Black Brigades in order to draw more men to the National Guard). Another rival of him was Marshal of Italy Rodolfo Graziani, an enmity which dated back to the time when Nicchiarelli had been his subordinate in Africa at the start of the war. Towards the end of 1944 Nicchiarelli started secretly negotiations with the Socialist partisan groups led by Corrado Bonfantini, aimed at guaranteeing a bloodless takeover at the end of the war. In April 1945, as the Italian Social Republic collapsed, he opposed the idea, suggested by some of the most hardliner Fascist leaders, of making a final stand in the Valtellina Redoubt. On 26 April he left Milan for Como, where he was captured by the partisans.

He was tried by the Extraordinary Court of Assizes, and on March 26, 1946 he was sentenced to twelve years and six months in prison for collaborationism, in addition to the confiscation of all assets. He immediately appealed the sentence, which was annulled by the Court of Cassation, and in the subsequent proceedings he was acquitted "because the fact ascribed to him does not constitute a crime". He was thus released after spending thirteen months in prison. Between 1946 and 1948 he played a key role in the birth of the International Anti-Bolshevik Front, a precursor of Gladio. He died in Milan in 1969.
