= Carlo Scorza =

Italian politician (1897–1988)

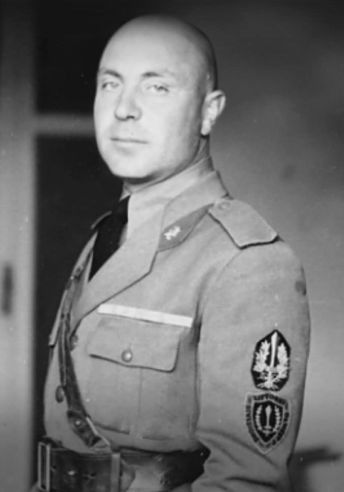

Secretary of the National Fascist Party
- In office 19 April 1943 – 27 July 1943
- Leader: Benito Mussolini
- Preceded by: Aldo Vidussoni
- Succeeded by: None

Personal details
- Born: 15 June 1897 Paola, Italy
- Died: 23 December 1988 (aged 91) Florence, Italy
- Party: FCI (1920–1921); PNF (1921–1943)
- Profession: Royal Italian Army officer, Blackshirts leader, journalist

Carlo Scorza (15 June 1897 – 23 December 1988) was an Italian politician. He was a prominent member of the National Fascist Party of Italy during World War II. He built his reputation in the Italian Fascist paramilitary group known as the Blackshirts, and later rose to the position of party secretary, second only to Benito Mussolini in authority over the Kingdom of Italy. His brief and rocky tenure began in the spring of 1943 and ended with the party's collapse and abolition at the end of July.

== Life ==
Born in the town of Paola, Scorza participated in World War I in the Bersaglieri corps, where he reached the rank of Tenente (lieutenant). After the war he joined Benito Mussolini's National Fascist Party and participated in acts of violence against communists and socialists in the area around Lucca. After participating in the March on Rome in 1922, he worked for a brief time as a journalist, then he was named Federale (chief provincial party officer) of the Province of Lucca.

In 1930, Scorza was appointed to direct the key Party youth organization, Gruppo Universitario Fascista. The following year he was named as a member of the Direttorio (national directorate) of the National Fascist Party. He strongly opposed the pro-Catholic Azione Cattolica, and his behavior forced Mussolini to dismiss him from the Direttorio. He participated in the Second Italo-Abyssinian War and the Spanish Civil War. In 1940 he resumed political activity at the national level.

== Secretary of PNF ==
In April 1943, Scorza was named Secretary of the National Fascist Party, replacing the ineffectual Aldo Vidussoni. He remained fully dedicated to Mussolini and he assumed his office with an uncompromising demand – "Everybody and everything for the war."

Despite his enthusiasm, Scorza failed in his efforts to revitalize the party. On 25 July 1943, the President of the Italian wartime Parliament, Dino Grandi, put forth to the Fascist Grand Council a motion to remove Mussolini from office. Scorza, who also held the position of Secretary of the Grand Council, voted against it, but the motion carried and Mussolini was arrested by the Carabinieri. After the Italian armistice, Scorza was arrested in the Nazi-controlled Italian Social Republic. He was charged with treason for failing to counter the anti-Fascist coup d'état, but he was acquitted by a special tribunal in April 1944.

== Later life ==
At the end of World War II, Scorza fled to Argentina. He was tried in absentia by the Allies and sentenced to thirty years imprisonment. He was later granted amnesty and he returned to Italy in 1955. Scorza died in Florence on 23 December 1988.

== In the Media ==
Carlo Scorza was portrayed by Serbian actor Vladan Živković in the 1985 TV miniseries Mussolini: The Untold Story.

Party political offices
Preceded by Aldo Vidussoni	Secretary of the National Fascist Party; 19 April – 27 July 1943	Party dissolved
