= Adelchi Serena =

Italian government official and fascist politician

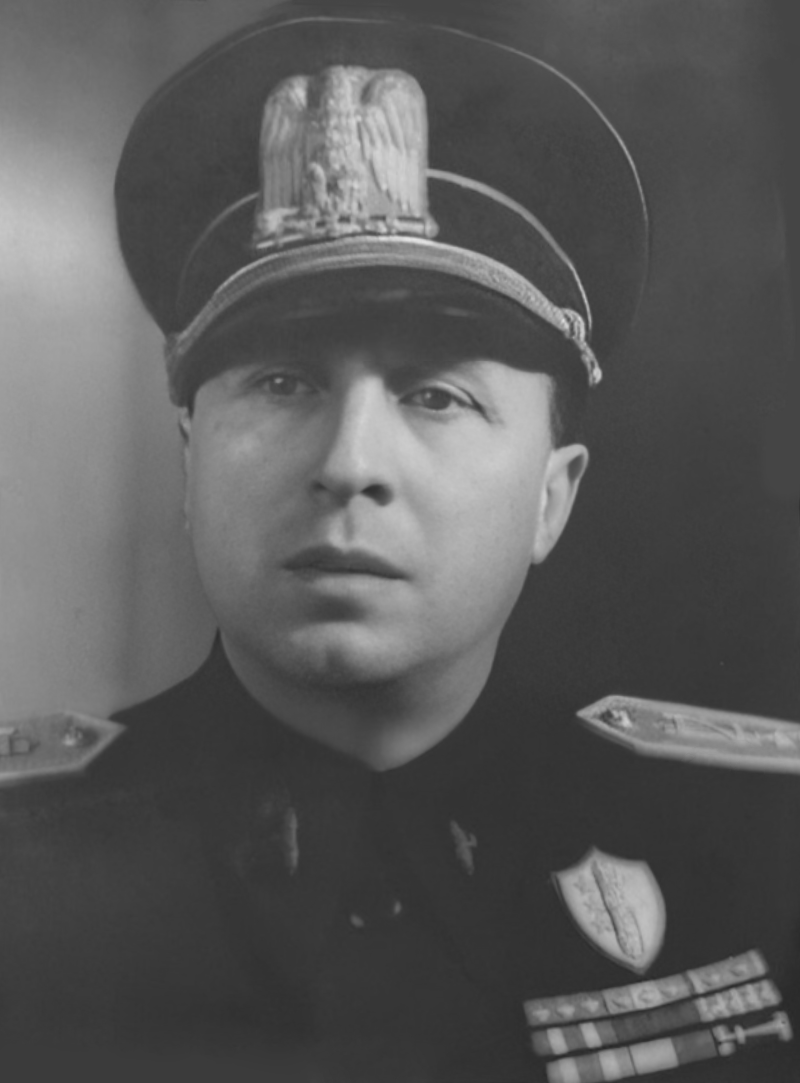

Secretary of the National Fascist Party
- In office 30 October 1940 – 26 December 1941
- Leader: Benito Mussolini
- Preceded by: Ettore Muti
- Succeeded by: Aldo Vidussoni

Minister of Public Works
- In office 31 October 1939 – 30 October 1940
- Prime Minister: Benito Mussolini
- Preceded by: Giuseppe Cobolli Gigli
- Succeeded by: Giuseppe Gorla

Personal details
- Born: 27 December 1895 L'Aquila, Kingdom of Italy
- Died: 29 January 1970 (aged 74) Rome, Italy
- Party: National Fascist Party
- Height: 1.68 m (5 ft 6 in)

Аdelchi Serena (27 December 1895 – 29 January 1970) was an Italian government official and fascist politician. He was party secretary of the National Fascist Party (Italian: Partito Nazionale Fascista, PNF) from October 1940 until December 1941.

== Biography ==
Adelchi Serena was born in 1895 in L'Aquila. After finishing judicial exams, he worked as an attorney. In 1915, he volunteered for the Royal Italian Army and participated in World War I, and was awarded a medal for military prowess. In 1921, he joined the Fascist movement and become a member of the PNF. In 1922, he became party secretary, and in 1926 he was nominated mayor of L'Aquila. From 1924 to 1939, he served as a deputy in the lower house of the Parliament of the Kingdom of Italy, the Chamber of Deputies. From 1932, he was a member of the directory of the PNF, and was a member of the Grand Council of Fascism in 1934–1937 and in 1940–1941. From 1933 to 1939, he was deputy to Achille Starace, national secretary of the PNF. From 1936 to 1939, he led active propaganda for the Second Italo-Ethiopian War. In 1939, he became Minister of Public Works. On 30 October 1940, he succeeded Ettore Muti as national secretary of the PNF. On 26 December 1941, he was replaced by Aldo Vidussoni. After the fall of the Fascist regime in Italy on 25 July 1943, he left politics and withdrew to private life. He died in 1970 in Rome.

== Bibliography ==
- Cavalieri, Walter; Marrella, Francesco (2010). Adelchi Serena il gerarca dimenticato [Adelchi Serena The Forgotten Gerarca] (in Italian). L'Aquila: Colacchi. ISBN 978-8-8886-7655-5.
- Gentile, Emilio (2001). La via italiana al totalitarismo. Il partito e lo Stato nel regime fascista [The Italian Way to Totalitarianism: The Party and the State in the Fascist Regime] (in Italian). Rome: Carocci. ISBN 978-8-8430-1836-9.
- Zalessky, Konstantin (2003). Kto byl kto vo Vtoroy mirovoy voyne. Soyuzniki Germanii [Who Was Who in World War II. Allies of Germany] (in Russian). Gorizia: Astrel. ISBN 978-5-1702-1314-6.

Government offices
| Preceded by Giuseppe Cobolli Gigli | Minister of Public Works; 31 October 1939 – 30 October 1940 | Succeeded by Giuseppe Gorla |
Party political offices
| Preceded by Ettore Muti | Secretary of the National Fascist Party; 30 October 1940 – 26 December 1941 | Succeeded by Aldo Vidussoni |
