= Domenico Romano =

Italian politician (1877–1965)

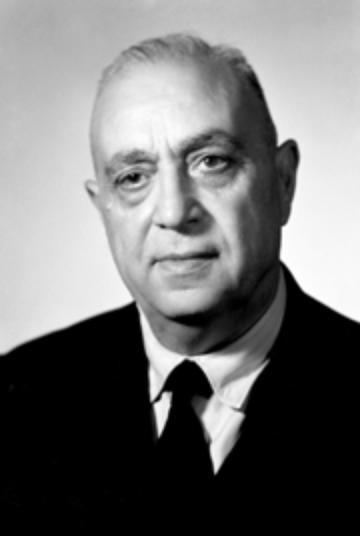

Minister of Public Works of the Kingdom of Italy
- In office 27 July 1943 – 11 February 1944
- Preceded by: Zenone Benini
- Succeeded by: Raffaele De Caro
- Member of the Senate of the Italian Republic
- In office 8 May 1948 – 15 May 1963

Personal details
- Born: 10 November 1877 Melicucco, Kingdom of Italy
- Died: 13 March 1965 (aged 87)
- Party: National Fascist Party; Christian Democracy
- Awards: Order of the Crown of Italy; Order of Saints Maurice and Lazarus

Domenico Romano (10 November 1877 – 13 March 1965) was an Italian politician and civil servant, who served as Minister of Public Works of the Kingdom of Italy in the Badoglio I Cabinet, and as Senator of the Italian Republic from 1948 to 1963.

== Biography ==
He was born in Melicucco, province of Reggio Calabria, in 1877, the son of Pasquale Romano and Teresa Napoli. After graduating in law from the University of Naples, he started a career as a lawyer which however he soon abandoned, starting to work at the Ministry of Public Works in 1904. During the following decades he gradually rose in rank at the Ministry, becoming director-general of special services in July 1929 and specializing in work related to areas affected by natural disasters; in early 1943 Zenone Benini, Minister of Public Works, appointed him as his head of cabinet. In 1925 he had joined the National Fascist Party.

On 27 July 1943, following the fall of the Fascist regime, he was appointed Minister of Public Works of the Badoglio I Cabinet, a post he formally held until February 1944, but de facto only until September 1943, as he was unable to join the government in its flight from Rome to Brindisi after the armistice of Cassibile and the German occupation of Rome and most of Italy. After the war he returned to his post as director-general of the Ministry of Public Works. He was later elected to the Senate of the Italian Republic with the Christian Democracy during the I, II and III Legislature, being a member, among other things, of the Permanent Commission for Public Works, Transports and Communications and of the Council for the South. He died in 1965.
