= Giuseppe Gorla =

Italian engineer and politician (1895–1970)

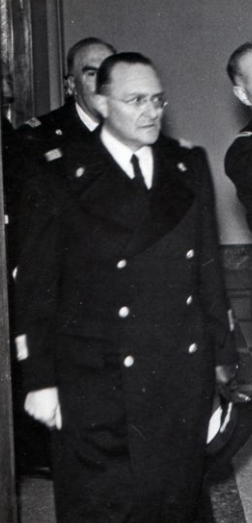
- Giuseppe Gorla in 1942

Minister of Public Works
- In office 30 October 1940 – 6 February 1943
- Prime Minister: Benito Mussolini
- Preceded by: Adelchi Serena
- Succeeded by: Zenone Benini

Personal details
- Born: 6 September 1895 Vernate, Lombardy, Kingdom of Italy
- Died: 15 January 1970 (aged 74) Milan, Italy
- Party: National Fascist Party
- Education: University of Pavia
- Occupation: Civil engineer

Giuseppe Gorla (1895–1979) was an Italian civil engineer and politician who was a member of the National Fascist Party. Between 1940 and 1943 he served as the minister of public works.

== Early life and education ==
Gorla was born in Vernate on 6 September 1895. He studied civil engineering at the University of Pavia. During his studies he was among the contributors of Il Popolo d'Italia.

Gorla joined the Italian army and fought in World War I. He was badly wounded and had to leave the army due to his disability occurred as a result of his injuries.

== Career ==
Following his return Gorla joined the National Association of the Mutilated and Disabled of War which was affiliated with the fascist movement. He began to work at the Polytechnic University of Milan as a faculty member. He left the academic career in 1922 when he was elected as city councillor in Milan. He was also named as the managing director of the publishing house. He participated various international meetings on urban planning in the mid-1920s. During this period he was the deputy mayor of Milan.

He was a board member of the National Fascist Engineers Union (SNFI) of which he served as the secretary general between 1937 and 1938. In February 1939, as secretary general of the SNFI, Gorla joined the Chamber of Fasces and Corporations. After shortly serving in the Italian army at beginning of World War II he was appointed minister of public works to the cabinet led by Benito Mussolini on 30 October 1940, replacing Adelchi Serena in the post. Gorla's term ended on 6 February 1943 when he was replaced by Zenone Benini as minister of public works.

Gorla was appointed national councilor for the Water Gas Electricity Corporation and a member of the Budget Committee of the Chamber immediately following the end of his ministerial tenure. In April 1943 he became president of the Italian general petroleum company (AGIP), and vice president of the national fuel hydrogenation company. He also served as the director of the Savings Bank of Milan. He maintained all these posts even after the end of Fascist rule and the establishment of a cabinet by Pietro Badoglio on 25 July 1943. Gorla served in these posts until October 1943 when he was removed from the office.

== Later years and death ==
Gorla was not subject to any legal process by the Allies and by the Italian authorities. In 1959 he published a book covering his memoirs entitled L’Italia nella seconda guerra mondiale. Diario di un milanese, ministro del re nel governo di Mussolini (Italian: Italy in the Second World War. Diary of a Milanese, minister of the king in the government of Mussolini). He died in Milan on 15 January 1970.
