= GNR Division Etna =

Divisione Etna
- Active: August, 23rd, 1944 - April, 27th, 1945
- Disbanded: April, 27th, 1945
- Country: Italian Social Republic
- Branch: National Republican Guard (Italy)
- Type: Infantry
- Role: Air defence Counter-paras
- Part of: National Republican Guard

Commanders
- Notable commanders: Giuseppe Volante; Giovanni Bocchio

The GNR Anti-aircraft and Anti-tank Division "Etna" (Italian: Divisione Antiaerea e anticarro "Etna") was a military formation of the National Republican Guard with air defence and counter-paratroopers warfare duties.

== History ==
The Division was established in August 1944, following contrasts with German military commands, in order to gather several autonomous units and to subordinate them to a General officer; this officer would have had a greater say in relationships with German allies. The German allies did also request the National Republican Guard to provide 7 000 personnel to strengthen their air-defence units: General Ricci rejected the German request and therefore was dismissed.

The new Chief of Staff of the National Republican Guard, General Nicchiarelli, decided the establishment of an "Anti-aircraft and Anti-tank" Division with counter-paratroopers duties, which would have gathered all still-autonomous combat units of the Italian Social Republic, including the Paratrooper Battalion "Mazzarini", the Armoured Group "Leonessa", the I Assault Battalion "Roma" and other units. The Etna Division operated under operational directives of the German Flak Command.

The division was based on two combat groups: the first was deployed on Sesia and Agogna rivers in Piedmont, to protect Lombardy, and the other was deployed between Adria, Rovigo, Ferrara, Mantua, and Ravenna.

The commander was General Giuseppe Volante, killed in action January 2, 1945. After the death of General Volante, Major General Giovanni Bocchio was appointed to lead the division.

In April 1945, when the Gothic Line was broken out, the southern divisional group surrendered; the Piedmontese combat group did not manage to reach Lombardy and had to surrender in various places of Piedmont.

== Subordinate units ==
During its operational history, the Division included several units:

- Military post unit 726
- I Assault Battalion "Roma"
- II Assault Battalion "Venezia Giulia"
- III "M" Assault Battalion "Pontida" (commanded by Major Carlo Zanotti)
- CXV "M" Battalion "Montebello" (commanded by Lieutenant Colonel Aurelio Languasco, Major Alessandro Manfredi, Captain Fernando Travaglini and Major Eugenio Sanchini)
- I Grenadiers Battalion "Ruggine" (commanded by Captain Angelo Nessi and Lieutenant Colonel Vittorio Mariani)
- II Anti-tank Battalion "Ruggine"
- III Assault Battalion "Ruggine" (commanded by Major Antonio Mammuccari)
- Duce's Guard Battalion
- Light Cavalry Unit
- Legion M "Tagliamento"
- Battalion "Fiamme Bianche"
- Paratroopers Battalion "Mazzarini"
- XXIX "M" Battalion (commanded by Major Paolo Arbizzoni)
- Armoured Group "Leonessa"
- Battalion "Boldrini"

== See also ==
- National Republican Guard (Italy)
- Italian Social Republic
