= Aldo Vidussoni =

Italian politician

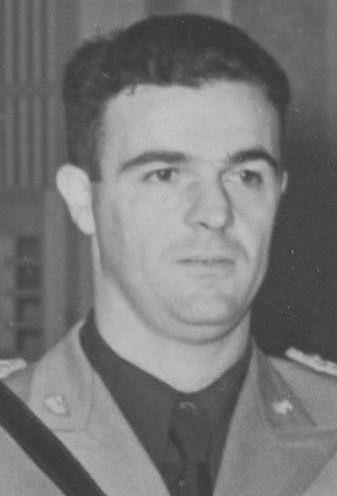
- Vidussoni in 1942

Secretary of the National Fascist Party
- In office 26 December 1941 – 19 April 1943
- Leader: Benito Mussolini
- Preceded by: Adelchi Serena
- Succeeded by: Carlo Scorza

Personal details
- Born: 21 January 1914 Fogliano Redipuglia, Kingdom of Italy
- Died: 30 November 1982 (aged 68) Cagliari, Italian Republic
- Party: National Fascist Party
- Height: 1.72 m (5 ft 8 in)

Aldo Vidussoni (21 January 1914 – 30 November 1982) was an Italian lawyer and Fascist politician.

After law studies at the University of Trieste, Vidussoni joined the Partito Nazionale Fascista (PNF) in May 1936. He was a volunteer soldier in the Second Italo-Abyssinian War, and then on Francisco Franco's side in the Spanish Civil War; he lost an eye and an arm on the Santander front, and was awarded a gold medal for valor in combat. Aldo Vidussoni's reputation made him an asset with the Benito Mussolini régime, and he became an important figure in the hierarchy of the Fascist university corporations - the Gruppi universitari fascisti (GUF). First a secretary of the GUF for the Province of Trieste (in 1938), he was (1940–1941) inspector for the GUF in Enna, and, in November–December 1941, national secretary of the GUF.

== Fascist Party leadership ==
On 26 December 1941, while still quite young, Vidussoni was appointed national secretary of the PNF, replacing Adelchi Serena by order of Mussolini. His scant political experience and the constant criticism of other leaders had made him ill-suited for the task: despite his initial appeal as a decorated soldier, he soon became widely regarded as ineffective, even "ridiculous".

According to the diaries of the Foreign Minister and son-in-law of Mussolini, Count Galeazzo Ciano, Vidussoni came to see him on 5 January 1942 with 'savage plans for the Slovenes. He wants to kill them all. I take the liberty of observing there are a million of them. "That does not matter", he answers firmly; "we must imitate the Askari and exterminate them!" I hope he will calm down'. Vidussoni was abruptly replaced by the ruthless squadrista Carlo Scorza in early 1943.

After the pro-Allied coup d'état inside the Grand Council of Fascism in late July 1943 and the armistice signed by the Pietro Badoglio government in Cassibile, Vidussoni chose to side with the Nazi-backed Italian Social Republic (established and led by Mussolini in the north). He became a leading member of the refounded PNF, the Partito Fascista Repubblicano (Republican Fascist Party).

After World War II, Aldo Vidussoni lived in Verona and then Cagliari. He worked in insurance.

Party political offices
Preceded by Adelchi Serena	Secretary of the National Fascist Party; 26 December 1941 – 19 April 1943	Succeeded by Carlo Scorza
