= Monte Sant'Angelo (Marche) =

Mountain in Italy

- Location within Italy

Highest point
- Elevation: 752 m (2,467 ft)
- Coordinates: 43°30′37″N 12°55′03″E

Geography
- Location: Marche, Italy
- Parent range: Apennine Mountains

Monte Sant'Angelo is a mountain of Marche, Italy.
