= Giuseppe Cobolli Gigli =

Italian politician (1892–1987)

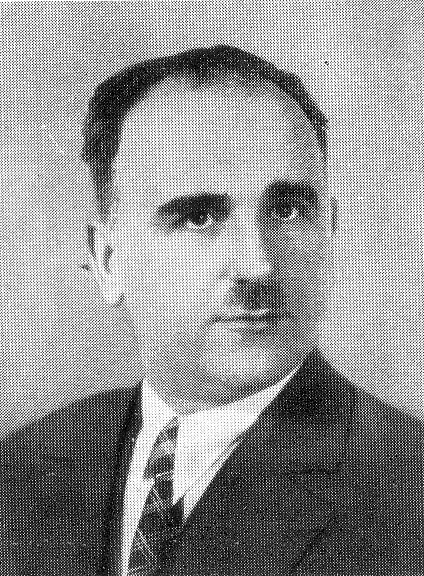

National Councilor of the Chamber of Fasces and Corporations
- In office 23 March 1939 – 5 August 1943

Minister of Public Works
- In office 5 September 1935 – 31 October 1939
- Prime Minister: Benito Mussolini
- Preceded by: Luigi Razza
- Succeeded by: Adelchi Serena

Undersecretary of State of the Minister of Public Works
- In office 24 January 1935 – 5 September 1935
- Prime Minister: Benito Mussolini

Member of the Chamber of Deputies
- In office 28 April 1934 – 2 March 1939
- Constituency: Trieste

Personal details
- Born: 28 May 1892 Trieste, Kingdom of Italy
- Died: 22 July 1987 (aged 95) Malnate, Italy
- Party: National Fascist Party; Republican Fascist Party
- Occupation: Engineer, politician

Giuseppe Cobolli Gigli (28 May 1892 – 22 July 1987) was an Italian engineer and politician. From 1935 to 1939, he was member of Benito Mussolini's Italian fascist government as minister of public works.

== Early life and family ==
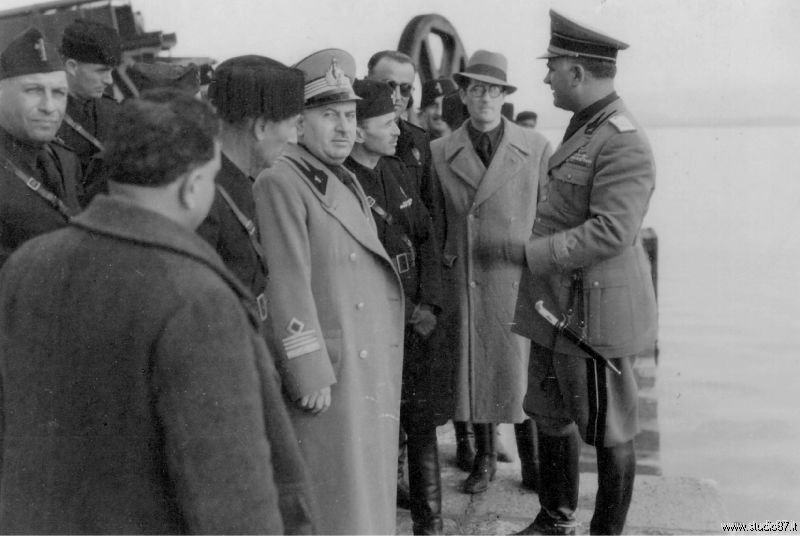
Cobolli Gigli in Sardinia in 1938

Giuseppe Cobolli Gigli was born in 1892 in Trieste, then part of the Imperial Free City of Trieste and its Territory, into a family of national liberalism persuasion. There is a dispute about his family origins. According to Pietro Valente, Cobolli Gigli was born from Nicolò Cobol (Koper, 1861 – Trieste, 1931), an elementary school teacher and Italian irredentist, to which Trieste has dedicated a Carso trail (la Napoleonica) for his creation of municipal recreation centers during the Habsburg times of Austria-Hungary. The name was later changed to Cobolli during Fascist Italy. The addition of Gigli to the surname was related to the experience of irredentist fighting during World War I. The unredeemed volunteer fighters in the Italian Army assumed a battle pseudonym to protect their families, and many added it, as the war was over, to their last name, as element of honour.

According to Valente, the children of Cobolli Gigli were Sergio, a guardiamarina on an anti-submarine engine during World War II; Antongiulio, an officer on the Eastern Front, where he was wounded in combat; and Niccolò, a fighter pilot who died in the skies of Greece and was decorated with the Gold Medal for Military Valour Memorial. Other sources, less detailed, reported Cobolli Gigli as being a member of a Slavic family. According to Giacomo Scotti, Giuseppe Cobolli Gigli was a minister of public works of the Fascist era and son of Nikolaus Combol, Slovenian primary school teacher, born in 1863; the last name was Italianized spontaneously in 1928, and since 1919 had given himself the pseudonym patriotic Giulio Italico. When he became a National Fascist Party (PNF) leader, he took a second surname, Gigli, giving itself a touch of nobility. According to Federico Vincenti, the father of Cobolli Gigli was the Slovenian Nikolaus Kobolj. According to Claudio Sommaruga, Cobolli Gigli was the son of an elementary school teacher Nicholas Cobol, from Koper (Italian: Capodistria), and he first assumed the pseudonym of Giulio Italico, until Italianizing it in 1928 in the name Cobolli, and after becoming a gerarca he added a second surname, Gigli.

== Political career ==
An engineer, after having fought as irredentist in the First World War, Cobolli Gigli began his political career in the fascist movement in 1919. That same year, under the pseudonym Giulio Italico, he produced the brochure Trieste, la fedele di Roma (English: Trieste, Faithful of Rome). He followed the cursus honorum within the PNF, which he joined in January 1922. He was the federal secretary of Trieste's PNF from 1927 to 1930, and the city's vice-podestà from 1933 to 1934. As the fascist ideologue Giuseppe Cobol, he wrote in the journal Gerarchia. In a September 1927 article entitled Il fascismo e gli allogeni (English: Fascism and the Aliens), he theorized the ethnic cleansing of Venezia Giulia, by replacing the populations with native Italian settlers from other provinces the Kingdom of Italy. In Trieste, la fedele di Roma, about Pazin, he reported: "The village lies on the edge of an abyss which the muse called foiba, a worthy place of burial for those who, in the province, threaten with bold claims the national characteristics of Istria."

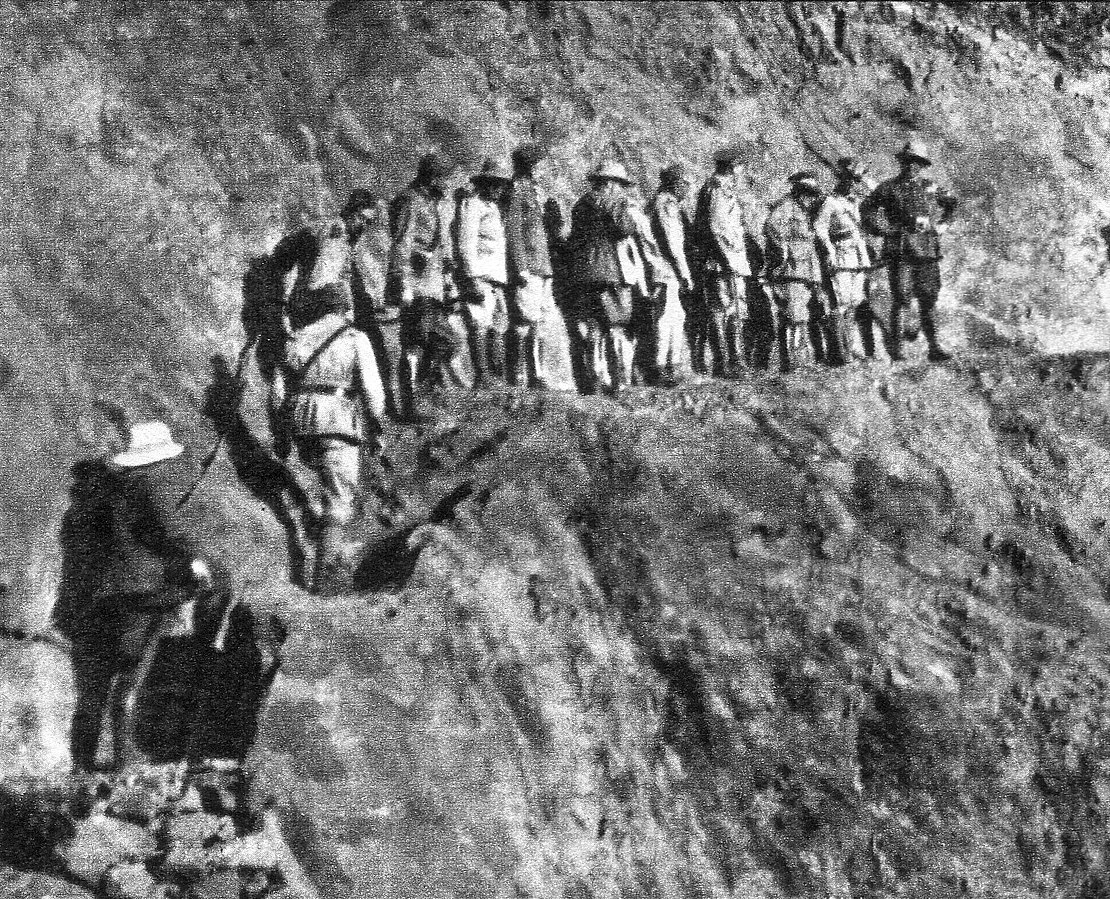
Cobolli Gigli in Uolchefit, Ethiopia

In 1934, Cobolli Gigli became a member of the Chamber of Deputies from Trieste. In January 1935, he was appointed Undersecretary of State for the Ministry of Public Works. Aged 43, from 5 September 1935, upon the death of Luigi Razza, to 31 October 1939, he was minister of public works in the Mussolini government, overseeing the great works carried out in the Italian colonies, a subject upon which he wrote the book Strade imperiale (English: Imperial Roads), published in 1938. He specialized in the development of road network in Italian Ethiopia. By order of Mussolini, he went to Italian East Africa at the end of 1936 for six months to deal with the development of the road network in Ethiopia and personally supervise the work of the various construction sites directed by the engineer Giuseppe Pini.

On 4 April 1939, at the National Institute of Roman Studies, he illustrated during a conference "the contribution of the Ministry of Public Works to the master plan of imperial Rome". In the national territory, he was among the proponents of the regulatory plan of Catanzaro and La Spezia (the first of the city), and the first signatory of the project to complete the former Busonera Hospital in Venice. In 1939, he became a national councilor of the Chamber of Fasci and Corporations. From 1939 to 1943, he was president of Agip, the Italian public oil company founded by Fascism.

== Later life and death ==
In 1943, Cobolli Gigli joined the Italian Social Republic and the Republican Fascist Party. As chairman of Italstrade, he collaborated with the Germans through Organization Todt in the construction of defensive structures. For this reason, at the end of the war he was tried for wartime collaboration and sentenced in the trial of first instance to 19 years in prison; this sentence was later annulled on appeal on 9 April 1946. He died on 22 July 1987 in Malnate at the age of 95.

== Honours ==
- War Merit Cross
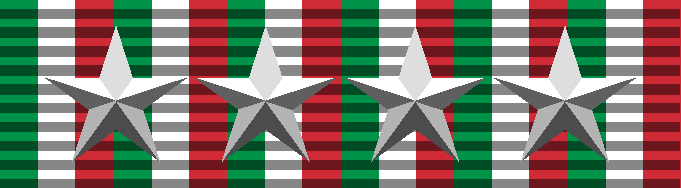
- Commemorative Medal for the Italo-Austrian War 1915–1918
- Commemorative Medal of the Unity of Italy
- Allied Victory Medal

== Works ==
- Italico, Giulio (1919). Trieste, la fedele di Roma (in Italian). Turin: Ed Lattes.
- Italico, Giulio (1920). "Una discesa nella grotta di Trebiciano". Le vie d'Italia (in Italian). No. 4. Milan: Touring Club Italiano.
- Italico, Giulio (1923). "Attraverso il Carso sotterraneo". Rivinsa Mensile del CAI (in Italian). No. October. Turin: Club Alpino Italiano.
- Italico, Giulio (1924). "Approvvigionamento idrico dell'Istria". Bollettino della Seziione di Trieste (in Italian). No. 2. Trieste: Associazione Nazazionale Ingegneri e Architetti Italiani. pp. 6–7.
- Cobolli Gigli, Giuseppe (1933). "Grandi lavori nelle grotte di S. Canziano". Le vie d'Italia (in Italian). No. 471. Milan: Touring Club Italiano.
- Cobolli Gigli, Giuseppe (1933). Provvedimenti idrici nella Venezia Giulia nel primo decennio fascista. Atti 1º Congr. Interregionale degli Ingegneri delle Tre Venezie (in Italian). Trieste. pp. 125–130.
- Cobolli Gigli, Giuseppe (1938). Opere pubbliche (in Italian). Milan: Mondadori.
- Cobolli Gigli, Giuseppe (1938). Strade imperiali (in Italian). Milan: Mondadori.
- Cobolli Gigli, Giuseppe (1939). Il contributo del Ministero dei Lavori Pubblici al Piano Regolatore di Roma imperiale (in Italian). Rome: Istituto Nazionale di Studi Romani.

== See also ==
- Giovanni Cobolli Gigli, lawyer and industrialist who is the grandson of Giuseppe and son of Antongiulio
- Minister of Public Works (Italy), postwar equivalent of Cobolli Gigli's ministry
