= National Republican Guard (Italy) =

National Republican Guard Guardia Nazionale Repubblicana
- GNR Insignia
- Active: 8 December 1943 – 28 April 1945
- Country: Italian Social Republic
- Type: Gendarmerie, Militia
- Size: 140,000
- Garrison/HQ: Rome (before 4 June 1944); Brescia (after 4 June 1944)
- Engagements: World War II: Italian Civil War; Italian Campaign

Commanders
- 1st Commander: Renato Ricci (8 Dec 1943 – 21 Aug 1944)
- 2nd Commander: Benito Mussolini (21 Aug 1944 – 28 Apr 1945)

The Italian National Republican Guard (Italian: Guardia Nazionale Repubblicana, or GNR) was a gendarmerie force of the Italian Social Republic created by decree on 8 December 1943, replacing the Carabinieri and the National Security Volunteer Militia (MVSN). General Renato Ricci appointed as its commandant. Major General Italo Romegialli was appointed vice commandant, and Major General Niccolò Nicchiarelli became the chief of general staff.

The GNR included former Carabinieri, MVSN militiamen, police officers, and members of the Italian African Police (PAI). While being an autonomous armed force before August 1944, on 15 August 1944, the National Republican Guard became a part of the army of the Italian Social Republic. However, it continued carrying out security tasks behind the lines and provided aid to German forces. On 21 August 1944, Benito Mussolini assumed direct command. On 23 August 1944, a separate division, GNR Division Etna, was formed in Brescia under the command of General Volante, to perform anti-paratrooper and anti-aircraft duties. Another division, GNR Vesuvio, was later formed.

== Organization of the GNR ==
- 1 headquarters Command
- 18 regional Inspectorates
- 94 provincial Commands
- 94 Legions
- 12 independent battalions
  - GNR - 'Mazzarini' GNR Parachute battalion of 300 men. It mainly operated against Italian partisans in the Po Valley from August 1944 until 1945.
- 82 companies
- 5 motorized battalions
- 3 squadrons
- 1 school centre
- 2 officer cadet schools
- 2 NCO schools
- 7 specialist police schools
- 1 arsenal
- 4 clothing and equipment stores
- 2 clothing procurement and issue facilities
- 1 band

== Special military services of the GNR ==
National Republican Guard collar parches

The GNR had the following Special military services:

1. Railway GNR, of 9 legions
2. Harbour GNR, of 3 legions
3. Post and Telegraph GNR, thirty small units
4. Mountain and Forests GNR, of 7 legions
5. Frontier GNR, of 5 legions
6. Highway GNR, many small units (traffic and highway patrol duties)

== Disarming of ex-Carabinieri ==
In August 1944, once Germany understood that MVSN were in the minority and that military ex-Carabinieri tended to join guerrilla partisans, the country decided to disarm and arrest the Carabinieri. Of the 11,000 Carabinieri still in service in the summer of 1944, 3,000 were sent to Germany before combing and equally, few were conducted over the Alps in the aftermath. After 25 August 1944, only 1,400 Carabinieri remained employed as either service workers or military bureaucrats.

== Reorganization ==
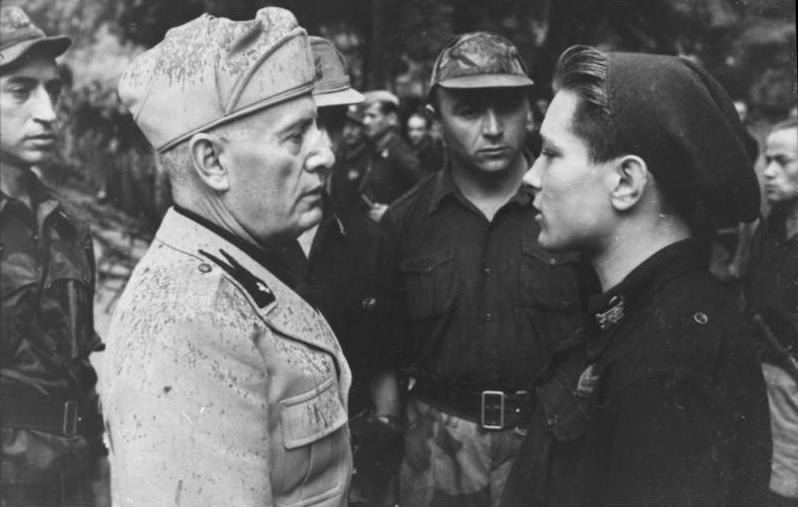
Mussolini inspecting adolescent guardsmen in northern Italy.

Following the disarmament of the Carabinieri, the GNR faced a deep crisis due to its smaller size: 35,000 troops for the territorial units, 11,000 between Guard Youth and students, and fewer than 5,000 for independent training. The weakening of the GNR also occurred through territorial governance reorganization. Most local districts previously served by Carabinieri had been dissolved. By September 1944, the Italian Social Republic's control over its territory was no longer as effective as it had once been. Eventually, a reorganization of the GNR occurred through a strengthening of territorial departments, while schools were established for officers.

The Republican Guard Youth was renamed Guard Youth Legionaria, with the transformation of assault battalions, legions and training centres. The newly established centralized department was named Etna Division, which coordinated the department used in Germany in FlaK (anti-aircraft) and anti-partisan departments employed by General Karl Wolff. The Etna Division absorbed, as a result, nine battalions of assault youth (for air defence) and October five operating divisions, four battalions and an assault battalion of paratroopers.

The only autonomous departments that remained were the Legion M Guardia del Duce, the Legion Tagliamento M, the Leonessa armoured group, and Legion Carmelo Borg Pisani.

Soldiers of the GNR were apparently posted to the German 65th Infantry Division in the winter of 1944–45 as replacements for the 1st Battalion of Grenadier Regiment 145.

== Ranks ==
=== Officers ===
Rank group	General / flag officers			Senior officers			Junior officers
National Republican Guard
National Republican Guard	Generale	Tenente generale	Maggiore generale	Colonnello	Tenente colonnello	Maggiore	Capitano	Tenente	Sottotenente

=== Other Ranks ===
Rank group	Senior NCOs					Junior NCOs	Enlisted
National Republican Guard								No insignia
National Republican Guard	Primo aiutante	Aiutante capo	Aiutante	Brigadiere	Vice brigadiere		Milite scelto	Milite

== Status of legitimate combatants ==
=== Postwar ===
With the end of the war the Italian troops fighting in the service of CSR were considered formed by Italian citizens who served militarily classified "military aid to the enemy" or "aid the enemy in his political plans" and therefore responsible for crimes punishable under the existing Military Code of Procedure of war thereby excluding these citizens could be considered military conflict, because to be considered somewhat rebellious against the legitimate state consisting of the Southern Kingdom, representing the legal continuity of the Italian State and recognized as such at the time well as from allied countries, including the majority of neutral nations.

Discrimination of CSR combatants was sanctioned by Legislative Decree 4 March 1948, n. 137. The Supreme Court, including the United Sections, has always considered legitimate in the sense that a long list of convictions for crimes of military aid to the enemy (Article 51 C. p. mil. War) and aid to the enemy in his designs Political Rights (art. 58). However, with the ruling of 26 April 1954 No 747, the Supreme Military Court "recognized the soldiers of the Italian Social Republic (RSI) the status of military combatants," denying, however, the same to the partisans.

=== Proposals of law ===
With specific reference to that single sentence, in the fourteenth term in the Senate was presented the draft Law 2244 ("Riconoscimento della qualifica di militari belligeranti a quanti prestarono servizio militare dal 1943 al 1945 nell'esercito della Repubblica sociale italiana" or "Recognition of Military Status for Soldiers Serving between 1943-1945 in the Army of the Italian Social Republic"). It since its introductory report - and then report to the House - revolved around the formal data on which it based its decision No. 747 del 1954: The Hague Conventions and Geneva, under which it can not be apart from the "principle of equality between the warring parties," according to which the law of war applies to both the aggressor as aggression, both equal before the laws of war. The text provoked an uprising by the political opposition to the government of the time and by the 'ANPI and was eventually abandoned.

Starting from a proposal made by President Carlo Azeglio Ciampi, which provides recognition of the model of the Knights of Vittorio Veneto fighters framed in the forces in the Italian Army during the 2nd World War, in the sixteenth legislature the bill n. 11360, 23 June 2008 has taken a more egalitarian approach than that presented in the previous XIV legislature, intending to give equally to all participants in the Second World War - fascist or not - "a similar recognition to that conferred by law March 18, 1968 No 263 fighters of the 1914-18 war. To this end, Article 1 of the bill established a new order of honour, the Order of the Tricolour, which includes the only class of Knight. The new award was to be awarded:

- to all those who have served the military for at least six months, even several times in the area of operations in the Italian armed forces during the 1940-45 war and military invalids or training or Gappisti regularly framed in partisan formations dependent Corps volunteers freedom;
- fighters of the war 1940-45;
- the maimed and disabled war pensioners 1940-45 war;
- to former prisoners or interned in concentration camps or prisons;
- fighters in the formations of the National Republican during the two years 1943-1945;

Providing for the payment of a living allowance to the survivors and presence on the board of regents of the Order, along with military representatives of republican institutions, associations and the president of the veterans 'Partisans of the President's Historical Institute of the Italian Social Republic.

Moreover, the same National Union Veterans of the Italian Social Republic (Unione Nazionale Combattenti della Repubblica Sociale Italiana), as a claimant to the status of combatants, "legitimate unlike the partisans," declared its disinterest in the draft law.

The bill, as a consequence of the invitation addressed to the constituency publicly by Dario Franceschini to Silvio Berlusconi after the speech commemorating the resistance held by the latter to Onna on 25 April, was withdrawn by the petitioner, the deputy Lucio Barani, on 28 April 2009.

== See also ==
- Militia
- Gendarmerie
- Portuguese National Republican Guard
- Waffen-SS
- Republican Police Corps (Italy)
