= List of Germans convicted of war crimes committed in Italy during World War II =

This is a list of Germans convicted of war crimes committed in Italy during World War II. War crimes in Italy were committed by both the Wehrmacht and the SS, which in turn was sub-divided into the combat forces of the Waffen-SS and the security and police forces of the Allgemeine-SS. Research in 2016 in the form of the Atlas of Nazi and Fascist Massacres in Italy, funded by the German government, found the number of victims of Nazi German and Fascist Italian war crimes to be 22,000. The victims were primarily Italian civilians, sometimes in retaliation to partisan attacks. Thousands of others were murdered because they were Jewish.

The perpetrators of most documented war crimes are unknown. Of those whose identities are known, only a small number were ever tried. After the war, both governments focused on improving Germany-Italy relations, rather than bringing war criminals to justice. This tendency was exacerbated by the prominence of former Nazis in the West German government and Italy's fears that its own citizens would be held accountable for crimes committed while Italy was part of the Axis. In addition, the Christian Democracy party in power in Italy after the war would not have benefitted politically from drawing attention to the Communist-dominated Italian resistance.

Recently, Italy has tried a number of German war criminals in absentia due to Germany's refusal to extradite them. These convicted criminals can avoid serving their prison sentences by remaining in Germany. Germany's refusal to extradite war criminals to Italy or prosecute them in German courts has ignited controversy. The response to Germany's refusal to extradite eight Germans convicted in absentia for the murder of 560 Italian civilians at Sant'Anna di Stazzema led to the German government's decision to fund research into war crimes committed by Axis forces in Italy.

Only a very small number of German military personnel were placed on trial in Italy in the first five years after the war, up to 1951. After 1951 only a handful of trials were conducted until 1996, when the case against Erich Priebke started a new wave of court cases. By then, in many cases, because decades elapsed between the crimes and their prosecution, the accused either had died already, died during the court case or were deemed too old to be extradited or serve time in jail. An example of those is the San Cesario sul Panaro massacre, where twelve civilians were killed and where three of the four officers accused died before the trial commenced in 2004 and the fourth one died on the second day of the trial, leaving the massacre without legal repercussions for the perpetrators.

== List ==
This is a list of convicted German war criminals:

Died in captivity	Executed	Released after serving part of his sentence	Tried in absentia and/or never served time	Escaped prison	Fate unknown or unclear

Name	Rank	Branch	Fate	Ref
Paul Albers	Untersturmführer	Waffen-SS	Sentenced to life in prison by an Italian court in 2007 for his role in the Marzabotto massacre, carried out by the 16th SS Panzergrenadier Division Reichsführer-SS and in 2008 for his role in two other massacres in Tuscany, not extradited by Germany.	
Heinrich Andergassen	Untersturmführer	SS	Sentenced to death on 16 January 1946 by an American military court and executed together with August Schiffer and Albert Storz on 26 July 1946 for the murders of OSS agent Roderick Stephen Hall, pilot Charles Parker, SAS officers Roger Littlejohn and David Crowley, and U.S. airmen George Hammond, Hardy Narron, and Medard Tafoya. Andergassen was also responsible for the round-up and deportations of 25 Jews from Merano, 24 of whom later died, and the torture and murder of Manlio Longon, an Italian partisan.	
Josef Baumann	Unterscharführer	Waffen-SS	Sentenced in absentia to life in prison by an Italian court in 2009 for his role in the Vinca massacre, carried out by the 16th SS Panzergrenadier Division Reichsführer-SS, not extradited by Germany.	
Hubert Bichler	Soldier	Waffen-SS	Sentenced in absentia to life in prison by an Italian court in 2009 for his role in the Vinca massacre, carried out by the 16th SS Panzergrenadier Division Reichsführer-SS, not extradited by Germany.	
Friedrich Boßhammer	Sturmbannführer	SS	Sentenced to life in prison by a German court in 1972 for his role in the deportation of 3,300 Italian Jews to Auschwitz, died before serving any time in jail.	
Werner Bruss	Unterscharführer	Waffen-SS	Sentenced in absentia to life in prison by an Italian court in 2005 for his role in the Sant'Anna di Stazzema massacre, carried out by the 16th SS Panzergrenadier Division Reichsführer-SS, not extradited by Germany.	
Hans Butz	Gendarmeriemeister	Ordnungspolizei	Sentenced to life in prison on 16 January 1946 by an American military court for his role in the murder of OSS agent Roderick Stephen Hall.	
Alfred Concina	Unterscharführer	Waffen-SS	Sentenced in absentia to life in prison by an Italian court in 2005 for his role in the Sant'Anna di Stazzema massacre, carried out by the 16th SS Panzergrenadier Division Reichsführer-SS, not extradited by Germany.	
Eduard Crasemann	Generalleutnant	Army	Crasemann, commander of the 26th Panzer Division, which was involved in the Padule di Fucecchio massacre, was found guilty of war crimes by a British military court and sentenced to 10 years imprisonment, dying in jail in 1950.	
Anton Dostler	General	Army	Dostler, commander of the LXXV Army Corps, was sentenced to death by an American military court and executed on 1 December 1945 for ordering the execution of 15 US soldiers who had been captured during a commando raid behind German lines.	
Friedrich Engel	Obersturmbannführer	SS	Sentenced to life in prison by an Italian court in 1999 for his role in the Turchino Pass massacre, not extradited by Germany, died without serving any time.	
Sigfried Engel	Obersturmbannführer	SS	Sentenced to life in prison by an Italian court in 1999 for his role in the Benedicta and Turchino massacres, not extradited by Germany, died without serving any time.	
Ludwig Göring	Rottenführer	Waffen-SS	Sentenced in absentia to life in prison by an Italian court in 2005 for his role in the Sant'Anna di Stazzema massacre, carried out by the 16th SS Panzergrenadier Division Reichsführer-SS, not extradited by Germany. Göring confessed to killing 20 women, collaborated with Italian authorities and showed remorse for his actions.	
Karl Gropler	Unterscharführer	Waffen-SS	Sentenced in absentia to life in prison by an Italian court in 2005 for his role in the Sant'Anna di Stazzema massacre, carried out by the 16th SS Panzergrenadier Division Reichsführer-SS, not extradited by Germany.	
Karl Hass	Hauptsturmführer	SS	Sentenced to life in prison by an Italian court in 1998 for his role in the Ardeatine massacre, died while under house arrest in Switzerland.	
Fritz Jauss	Warrant officer	Army	Sentenced to life in prison by an Italian court in 2011 for his role in the Padule di Fucecchio massacre, carried out by the 26th Panzer Division, not extradited by Germany.	
Herbert Kappler	Obersturmbannführer	SS	Sentenced to life in prison by an Italian court in 1948 for his role in the Ardeatine massacre, escaped prison in 1977 and died six month later.	
Albert Kesselring	Generalfeldmarschall	Luftwaffe	Sentenced to death by a British military court in Rome in 1946 for his role in the Ardeatine massacre as German commander in the Mediterranean theatre, sentence commuted, released in 1952.	
Erich Koeppe	Oberleutnant	Luftwaffe	Sentenced to life in prison by an Italian court in 2011 for his role in the Monchio massacre, carried out by the Fallschirm-Panzer-Division 1 "Hermann Göring", not extradited by Germany.	
Wilhelm Kusterer	Unterscharführer	Waffen-SS	Sentenced in absentia to life in prison by an Italian court in 2009 for his role in the Vinca massacre, carried out by the 16th SS Panzergrenadier Division Reichsführer-SS, not extradited by Germany.	
Herman Langer	Officer	Waffen-SS	Sentenced to life in prison by an Italian court in 2005 for his role in the Certosa di Farneta massacre, carried out by the 16th SS Panzergrenadier Division Reichsführer-SS, not extradited by Germany, died without serving any time.	
Wolfgang Lehnigk-Emden	Oberleutnant	Army	Sentenced to life in prison by an Italian court in the murder of twenty-two civilians at Caiazzo, near Naples but not extradited. Lehnigk-Emden, an officer of the 3rd Panzergrenadier Division, was captured by Allied forces during the war, confessed the crime but then released by accident. He was found guilty of manslaughter by the Bundesgerichtshof but released because of the Statute of limitations.	
Alfred Lühmann	Leutnant	Luftwaffe	Sentenced in absentia to life in prison by an Italian court in 2012 for his role in the Monchio, Susano and Costrignano massacre, carried out by the 1st Fallschirm-Panzer Division "Hermann Göring", not extradited by Germany.	
Eberhard von Mackensen	Generaloberst	Army	Sentenced to death by a British military court in Rome in 1946 for his role in the Ardeatine massacre as the commander of the German 14th Army, sentence commuted, released in 1952.	
Kurt Mälzer	Generalleutnant	Luftwaffe	Sentenced to death by a British military court in Rome in 1946 for his role in the Ardeatine massacre as the Military Commander of Rome, sentence commuted to life in prison, died in prison in 1952.	
Gottfried Meir	Obersturmführer	Waffen-SS	Sentenced in absentia to life in prison by an Italian court in 1955 for his role in the 1943 murder of Jewish banker Ettore Ovazza and his family, part of the Lake Maggiore massacres, not extradited by Austria.	
Helmut Odenwald	Major	Luftwaffe	Sentenced to life in prison by an Italian court in 2011 for his role in the Monchio massacre, carried out by the Fallschirm-Panzer-Division 1 "Hermann Göring", not extradited by Germany.	
Fritz Olberg	Leutnant	Luftwaffe	Sentenced to life in prison by an Italian court in 2011 for his role in the Monchio massacre, carried out by the Fallschirm-Panzer-Division 1 "Hermann Göring", not extradited by Germany.	
Ferdinand Osterhaus	Leutnant	Luftwaffe	Sentenced to life in prison by an Italian court in 2011 for his role in the Monchio massacre, carried out by the Fallschirm-Panzer-Division 1 "Hermann Göring", not extradited by Germany.	
Ernst Pistor	Hauptmann	Army	Sentenced to life in prison by an Italian court in 2011 for his role in the Padule di Fucecchio massacre, carried out by the 26th Panzer Division, not extradited by Germany.	
Erich Priebke	Hauptsturmführer	SS	Sentenced to life in prison by an Italian court in 1998 for his role in the Ardeatine massacre, died while under house arrest.	
Georg Rauch	Untersturmführer	Waffen-SS	Sentenced in absentia to life in prison by an Italian court in 2005 for his role in the Sant'Anna di Stazzema massacre, carried out by the 16th SS Panzergrenadier Division Reichsführer-SS, not extradited by Germany.	
Walter Reder	Sturmbannführer	Waffen-SS	Sentenced to life in prison by an Italian military court for his role in the Marzabotto massacre as the commander of the SS-Panzer-Aufklärungsabteilung 16 of the 16th SS Panzergrenadier Division Reichsführer-SS, released in 1985.	
Horst Richter	Unterscharführer	Waffen-SS	Sentenced in absentia to life in prison by an Italian court in 2005 for his role in the Sant'Anna di Stazzema massacre, carried out by the 16th SS Panzergrenadier Division Reichsführer-SS, not extradited by Germany.	
Johan Robert Riss	Sergeant	Army	Sentenced to life in prison by an Italian court in 2011 for his role in the Padule di Fucecchio massacre, carried out by the 26th Panzer Division, not extradited by Germany.	
Max Roithmeier	Unterscharführer	Waffen-SS	Sentenced in absentia to life in prison by an Italian court in 2009 for his role in the Vinca massacre, carried out by the 16th SS Panzergrenadier Division Reichsführer-SS, not extradited by Germany.	
Arnold Rösler	Unterscharführer	Waffen-SS	Sentenced in absentia to life in prison by an Italian court in 2009 for his role in the Vinca massacre, carried out by the 16th SS Panzergrenadier Division Reichsführer-SS, not extradited by Germany.	
Theo Saevecke	Hauptsturmführer	SS	Sentenced to life in prison by an Italian court in 1999 for his role in the Piazzale Loreto massacre, not extradited by Germany, died without serving any time.	
Heinrich Schendel	Unterscharführer	Waffen-SS	Sentenced in absentia to life in prison by an Italian court in 2005 for his role in the Sant'Anna di Stazzema massacre, carried out by the 16th SS Panzergrenadier Division Reichsführer-SS, not extradited by Germany.	
Josef Scheungraber	Leutnant	Army	Sentenced to life in prison by an Italian court in 2006 and a German court in 2012 for his role in the Falzano di Cortona massacre, carried out by the a German Mountain Division, not extradited by Germany, died without serving any time.	
August Schiffer	Sturmbannführer	SS	Sentenced to death on 16 January 1946 by an American military court and executed together with Heinrich Andergassen and Albert Storz on 26 July 1946 for the murders of OSS agent Roderick Stephen Hall, pilot Charles Parker, SAS officers Roger Littlejohn and David Crowley, and U.S. airmen George Hammond, Hardy Narron, and Medard Tafoya.	
Adolf Schneider	Unterscharführer	Waffen-SS	Sentenced in absentia to life in prison by an Italian court in 2009 for his role in the Vinca massacre, and in 2007 in the Marzabotto massacre, carried out by the 16th SS Panzergrenadier Division Reichsführer-SS, not extradited by Germany.	
Max Schneider	Sergeant	Waffen-SS	Sentenced in absentia to life in prison by an Italian court in 2007 for his role in the Marzabotto massacre, carried out by the 16th SS Panzergrenadier Division Reichsführer-SS, not extradited by Germany.	
Alfred Schoneberg	Unterscharführer	Waffen-SS	Sentenced in absentia to life in prison by an Italian court in 2005 for his role in the Sant'Anna di Stazzema massacre, carried out by the 16th SS Panzergrenadier Division Reichsführer-SS, not extradited by Germany.	
Kurt Schuster	Sergeant	Army	Sentenced to life in prison by an Italian court in the murder of twenty-two civilians at Caiazzo near Naples, alongside Wolfgang Lehnigk-Emden, both members of the 3rd Panzergrenadier Division, not extradited by Germany.	
Michael Seifert	Rottenführer	SS	Sentenced to life in prison in absentia by an Italian court in 2000 for murder during his time as a guard at the Bolzano Transit Camp, extradited by Canada in 2008, died in prison.	
Max Simon	Gruppenführer	Waffen-SS	Sentenced to death by a British military court for his role in the Marzabotto massacre as the commander of the 16th SS Panzergrenadier Division Reichsführer-SS, sentence commuted, released in 1954.	
Gerhard Sommer	Untersturmführer	Waffen-SS	Sentenced in absentia to life in prison by an Italian court in 2005 for his role in the Sant'Anna di Stazzema massacre, carried out by the 16th SS Panzergrenadier Division Reichsführer-SS, not extradited by Germany.	
Ludwig Heinrich Sonntag	Unterscharführer	Waffen-SS	Sentenced in absentia to life in prison by an Italian court in 2005 for his role in the Sant'Anna di Stazzema massacre, carried out by the 16th SS Panzergrenadier Division Reichsführer-SS, not extradited by Germany.	
Kurt Spieler	Soldier	Waffen-SS	Sentenced to life in prison by an Italian court in 2007 for his role in the Marzabotto massacre, carried out by the 16th SS Panzergrenadier Division Reichsführer-SS, not extradited by Germany.	
Wilhelm Stark	Sergeant	Luftwaffe	Sentenced in absentia to life in prison by an Italian court in 2012 for his role in the Monchio, Susano and Costrignano massacre, carried out by the 1st Fallschirm-Panzer Division Hermann Göring, not extradited by Germany.	
Alfred Stork	Unteroffizier	Army	Sentenced in absentia to life in prison by an Italian court in 2013 for his role in the massacre of Cephalonia, carried out by the 1st Mountain Division, not extradited by Germany.	
Albert Storz	Oberscharführer	SS	Sentenced to death on 16 January 1946 by an American military court and executed together with Heinrich Andergassen and August Schiffer on 26 July 1946 for the murders of OSS agent Roderick Stephen Hall, pilot Charles Parker, SAS officers Roger Littlejohn and David Crowley, and U.S. airmen George Hammond, Hardy Narron, and Medard Tafoya.	
Heinz Fritz Träger	Unterscharführer	Waffen-SS	Sentenced in absentia to life in prison by an Italian court in 2009 for his role in the Vinca massacre, carried out by the 16th SS Panzergrenadier Division Reichsführer-SS, not extradited by Germany.	
Georg Wache	Unterscharführer	Waffen-SS	Sentenced in absentia to life in prison by an Italian court in 2009 for his role in the Vinca massacre, carried out by the 16th SS Panzergrenadier Division Reichsführer-SS, not extradited by Germany.	
Ernst Wadenpfuhl	Oberleutnant	Kriegsmarine	Sentenced in absentia to life in prison by an Italian court in 2012 for his role in the Borgo Ticino massacre, carried out by the 80th Marineeinsatzkommando of the German Navy, not extradited by Germany. Wadenpfuhl died one month after having been sentenced.	
Walter Wagge	Unterscharführer	Waffen-SS	Sentenced in absentia to life in prison by an Italian court in 2009 for his role in the Vinca massacre, carried out by the 16th SS Panzergrenadier Division Reichsführer-SS, not extradited by Germany.	
Hans Georg Winkler	Sergeant	Luftwaffe	Sentenced in absentia to life in prison by an Italian court in 2012 for his role in the Monchio, Susano and Costrignano massacre, carried out by the 1st Fallschirm-Panzer Division Hermann Göring, not extradited by Germany.	
Karl Wolff	Obergruppenführer	SS	Sentenced to 5 years in prison by a denazification court in 1948. Released on time served in 1949, after his sentence was reduced to 4 years. Sentenced to an additional 15 years in prison by a German court in 1964 for his role in the mass deportations of Jews, including Italian Jews. Released early on health grounds in 1971.	
Helmut Wulf	Scharführer	Waffen-SS	Sentenced to life in prison by an Italian court in 2007 for his role in the Marzabotto massacre, carried out by the 16th SS Panzergrenadier Division Reichsführer-SS, not extradited by Germany.	
