= List of Wehrmacht and Waffen-SS divisions that committed war crimes in Italy =

This is a list of Wehrmacht and Waffen-SS divisions that committed war crimes in Italy during World War II. War crimes by German combat divisions in Italy were committed by the Waffen-SS and the Wehrmacht, with its sub-branches, the army, Luftwaffe (air force) and Kriegsmarine (navy). Historically, the view existed that the Wehrmacht fought a clean campaign there and the atrocities and war crimes were committed only by the SS, and in the latter case predominantly by the Einsatzgruppen and concentration camp guards, not by the Waffen-SS. This view has been refuted by modern research, which found that the Wehrmacht and Waffen-SS were equally involved in war crimes.

== Background ==
Research in 2016 funded by the German government found the number of victims of Nazi war crimes in Italy to be 22,000, double the previously estimated figure. The victims were primarily Italian civilians, sometimes in retaliation for partisan attacks under the doctrine of Bandenbekämpfung ("bandit fighting"), and Italian Jews.

The killing of Italian civilians by front-line units of the Wehrmacht and SS has sometimes been seen as stemming from a sense of betrayal the Germans felt by the Italians signing the Armistice of Cassibile, but historians have argued that the reasons for atrocities and the brutal behaviour were more complex, often resulting from the military crisis caused by the German retreats and the fear of ambushes.

Only very few soldiers of German divisions accused of war crimes ever stood trial and even fewer served time in jail after their conviction. Notable exceptions include Eduard Crasemann, commander of the 26th Panzer Division, which was involved in the Padule di Fucecchio massacre, and who was found guilty of war crimes by an Allied military tribunal and sentenced to 10 years imprisonment, dying in jail in 1950, and Walter Reder, sentenced to life in prison by an Italian military court for his role in the Marzabotto massacre as the commander of the SS-Panzer-Aufklärungsabteilung 16 of the 16th SS Panzergrenadier Division Reichsführer-SS, who was released in 1985.

The 1st Fallschirm-Panzer Division Hermann Göring and 16th SS Panzergrenadier Division Reichsführer-SS were disproportionally involved in massacres of the civilian population during the war in Italy, the two divisions accounting for approximately one third of all civilians killed in war crimes in the country.

== List ==
Wehrmacht and Waffen-SS divisions that committed war crimes in Italy:

Division	Branch	Major incidents (Note: Major incidents included in this column are massacres with more than 50 victims. If a unit was only involved in massacres with less than 50 victims, the time period in which war crimes were committed and the highest number of victims are stated instead.)	Ref.
1st SS Panzer Division	Waffen-SS	Boves massacre (Piedmont), 19 September 1943, 21 civilians executed; Lake Maggiore massacres, September & October 1943, up to 56 Jewish civilians killed	
1st Fallschirm-Panzer Division	Luftwaffe	Acerra massacre (Campania), 1–3 October 1943, 84 civilians executed; Naples massacre (Campania), 1 October 1943, 93 civilians executed; Monchio, Susano and Costrignano massacre (Emilia-Romagna), 1 March 1944, 130 civilians executed; Vallucciole massacre (Tuscany), 13 April 1944, 107 civilians executed; Civitella in Val di Chiana massacre (Tuscany), 29 June 1944, 146 civilians executed; Cavriglia massacre (Tuscany), 4 July 1944, 173 civilians executed	
1st Parachute Division	Luftwaffe	Pietransieri massacre (Abruzzo), 21 November 1943, 125 civilians executed	
2nd Parachute Division	Luftwaffe	A number of incidents between September and November 1943, with up to seven civilians executed in each incident	
3rd Panzergrenadier Division	Army	A number of incidents between September 1943 and August 1944, with up to twenty two civilians executed in each incident	
4th Parachute Division	Luftwaffe	Pedescala massacre (Veneto), 30 April–2 May 1945, 63 civilians executed	
5th Mountain Division	Army	Grugliasco massacre (Piedmont), alongside the 34th Infantry Division, 30 April 1945, 67 civilians executed	
15th Panzergrenadier Division	Army	Bellona massacre (Campania), 6–7 October 1943, 54 civilians executed	
16th Panzer-Division	Army	San Clemente di Caserta massacre (Campania), 4 October 1943, 25 civilians executed	
16th SS Panzergrenadier Division	Waffen-SS	Sant'Anna di Stazzema massacre (Tuscany), 12 August 1944, 394 civilians executed; San Terenzo Monti massacre (Tuscany), 17–19 August 1944, 159 civilians executed; Vinca massacre (Tuscany), 24–27 August 1944, 162 civilians executed; San Leonardo al Frigido massacre (Tuscany), 16 September 1944, 149 civilians executed; Marzabotto massacre (Emilia-Romagna), 29 September–5 October 1944, 770 civilians executed	
19th Luftwaffe Field Division	Luftwaffe	Guardistallo massacre (Tuscany), 29 June 1944, 55 civilians executed	
20th Luftwaffe Field Division	Luftwaffe	A number of incidents between July and August 1944, with up to twenty civilians executed in each incident	
24th Waffen Mountain Division	Waffen-SS	Fosse del Natisone massacre (Cividale del Friuli, Julian March), execution of 105 civilians, soldiers and partisans after the Italian surrender	
26th Panzer-Division	Army	Padule di Fucecchio massacre (Tuscany), 23 August 1944, 174 civilians executed	
29th Panzergrenadier Division	Army	San Martino di Lupari (Veneto), 29 April 1945, 125 prisoners executed	
34th Infantry Division	Army	Grugliasco massacre (Piedmont), alongside the 5th Mountain Division, 30 April 1945, 67 civilians executed	
42nd Jäger Division	Army	Ronchidoso massacre (Emilia-Romagna), alongside the 65th Infantry Division, 28–30 November 1944, 66 civilians executed	
44th Infantry Division	Army	A number of incidents between March and September 1944, with up to thirty-three civilians executed in each incident	
65th Infantry Division	Army	Ronchidoso massacre (Emilia-Romagna), alongside the 42nd Jäger Division, 28–30 November 1944, 66 civilians executed	
71st Infantry Division	Army	Tićan massacre (Višnjan, now in Croatia), 11 September 1943, 84 civilians executed	
90th Panzergrenadier Division	Army	A number of incidents between August 1944 and April 1945, with up to five civilians executed in each incident	
92nd Infantry Division	Army	A number of incidents between March and July 1944, with up to eleven civilians executed in each incident	
94th Infantry Division	Army	San Polo massacre (Tuscany), 14 July 1944, 63 civilians executed	
114th Jäger Division	Army	Madonna dell'Albero massacre (Emilia-Romagna), 27 November 1944, 56 civilians executed	
148th Infantry Division	Army	One incident recorded, the Regnano Castello massacre (Tuscany), 23 November 1944, 14 civilians executed	
162nd Turkoman Division	Army	A number of incidents between December 1943 and May 1945, two of those, in January 1945 in the Emilia-Romagna resulted in the execution of at least 20 civilians each	
232nd Infantry Division	Army	A number of incidents between August and September 1944, with up to five civilians executed in each incident	
278th Infantry Division	Army	A number of incidents between March and July 1944, with up to seven civilians executed in each incident	
305th Infantry Division	Army	A number of incidents between October 1943 and April 1945, with up to twelve civilians executed in each incident	
334th Infantry Division	Army	A number of incidents between February and September 1944, with up to thirty civilians executed in each incident	
356th Infantry Division	Army	Benedicta massacre (Piedmont), 6–7 April 1944, 97 civilians executed	
362nd Infantry Division	Army	Involved in the Marzabotto massacre (Emilia-Romagna), alongside the 16th SS Panzergrenadier Division, 29 September–5 October 1944, 770 civilians executed	
