= San Terenzo Monti massacre =

War crime in Italy in 1944

- Part of German war crimes in Italy during World War II
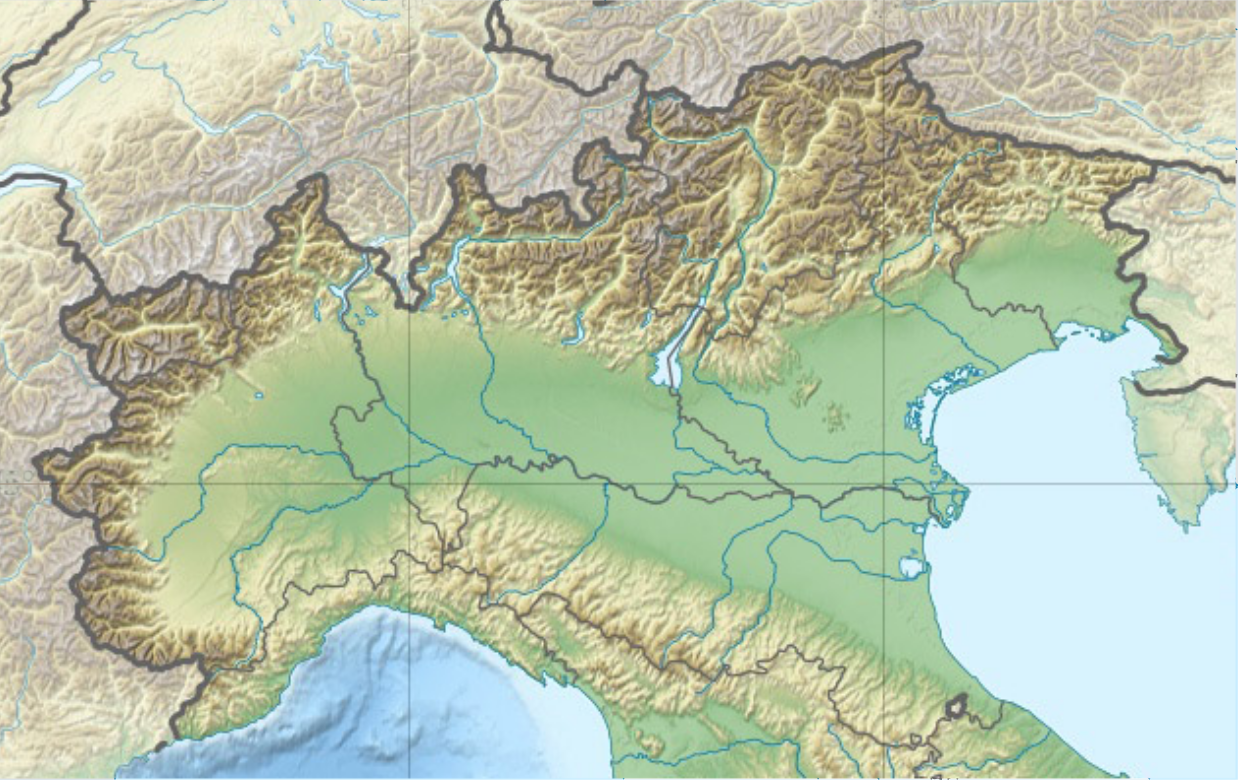
- San Terenzo Monti massacre (Northern Italy)
- Native name: L’eccidio di San Terenzo Monti
- Location: 44°17′N 10°04′E; Bardine San Terenzo & San Terenzo Monti, Tuscany, Italy
- Date: 17–19 August 1944
- Target: Italian civilian population
- Attack type: Massacre
- Weapon: Machine guns
- Deaths: 159
- Perpetrator: Walter Reder
- Motive: Reprisal for Italian partisan activity
- Charges: Murder

The San Terenzo Monti massacre (Italian: L’eccidio di San Terenzo Monti), sometimes also referred to as the Bardine massacre or Bardine San Terenzo massacre, was a massacre carried out near Fivizzano, Tuscany, by the German 16th SS Panzergrenadier Division from 17 to 19 August 1944 in which 159 Italian civilians were killed.

It was one of numerous war crimes the division was involved in while stationed in Italy during the war.

== Massacre ==
In August 1944 partisan activity in the rear of the German front line, the Gothic Line, increased. On the morning of 17 August, a detachment consisting of German troops on trucks arrived in the hamlet of Bardine, about two kilometres from San Terenzo Monti to confiscate livestock. On their return trip the German troops were attacked by partisans, at the request of the inhabitants of Bardine. In the ensuring fight with the partisans, 16 German soldiers were killed.

German troops soon returned to the area to recover their dead and destroy local villages as well as kill a number of civilians, while beginning to plan a larger operation in the area. On 19 August German troops, commanded by Walter Reder, returned with 53 civilian prisoners captured a week earlier and executed them at the location of the previous partisan attack. They then proceeded to round up the local population, mostly women, children and elderly, and executed them as well. A total of 159 civilians were killed in the operation, regardless of whether they had any involvement with the partisan movement.

== Aftermath ==
In 1951 Walter Reder (1915–1991) was sentenced to life imprisonment by a military court in Bologna for the massacres of Vinca and Marzabotto. In 1985 Reder was granted amnesty and was released.

== In popular culture ==
In 2018 the joint Italian-German documentary The name of the father (Italian: Il nome del padre) was produced. It tells the story of the son of Josef Maier, Udo Surer, a German lawyer from Bavaria, who discovered in 2004 that his father was involved in the San Terenzo Monti and Vinca massacres.
