= Gerhard Sommer =

German SS officer (1921–2019)

- Born: 24 June 1921; Hamburg, Weimar Republic
- Died: 2019 (aged 97–98); Hamburg, Germany
- Military career
- Allegiance: Nazi Germany
- Branch: Hitlerjugend (Deutsche Jungvolk); Schutzstaffel (SS)
- Rank: Jungzugführer (in Hitler Youth); Untersturmführer (second lieutenant)
- Units: 1st SS Division Leibstandarte SS Adolf Hitler; 16th SS Panzergrenadier Division Reichsführer-SS
- Conflicts: World War II
- Awards: Iron Cross 1st Class; Iron Cross 2nd Class

Gerhard Sommer (24 June 1921 – 2019) was a German SS-Untersturmführer (second lieutenant) in the 16th SS Panzergrenadier Division Reichsführer-SS who was involved in the massacre of 560 civilians on 12 August 1944 in the Italian village of Sant'Anna di Stazzema. He appeared on the Simon Wiesenthal Center's list of most wanted Nazi war criminals.

== Biography ==
Sommer was born in Hamburg in June 1921. In July 1933, when he was 12 years old, Sommer became a member of the Hitlerjugend (Hitler Youth), where he obtained the rank of Jungzugführer (young platoon leader) in the Deutsches Jungvolk. On 1 September 1939, at age 18, he joined the Nazi Party NSDAP and in October enlisted in the Waffen-SS.

Sommer fought in the 1st SS Division Leibstandarte SS Adolf Hitler in the Balkans and Ukraine. He was wounded twice and was awarded the Iron Cross 2nd class. In 1943, Sommer applied for the rank of SS-Reserveführer. After training in Proschnitz, he was appointed an SS-Untersturmführer on January 30, 1944. He served as a Zugführer and later a Kompanieführer in the 7th Kompanie des II. Bataillons/SS-Panzergrenadier-Regiment 35. On 19 August 1944, he received the Iron Cross 1st class. Near the end of the war, Sommer served in the 4th SS Volunteer Panzergrenadier Brigade Netherlands.

On 22 June 2005, Sommer and nine other former SS members were convicted by an Italian military court in La Spezia for the "continued murder with special cruelty" of 560 villagers at Sant'Anna di Stazzema. All ten were sentenced to life imprisonment and ordered to pay compensation payments.

In 2002, investigations against Sommer were initiated in Germany, but no criminal charges were brought. Gabriela Heinecke, a lawyer from Hamburg in charge of the "Nebenklage" of the Italian survivors of the massacre continues to be denied access to the records by the German public prosecution department. As of May 2006, Sommer was living in a nursing home in Hamburg-Volksdorf, Germany. In May 2015, Sommer was declared unfit for trial due to severe dementia by prosecutors in Germany.

In October 2021, it was revealed that Sommer had died in 2019.
