= Palazzo Cesi-Gaddi war crimes archive =

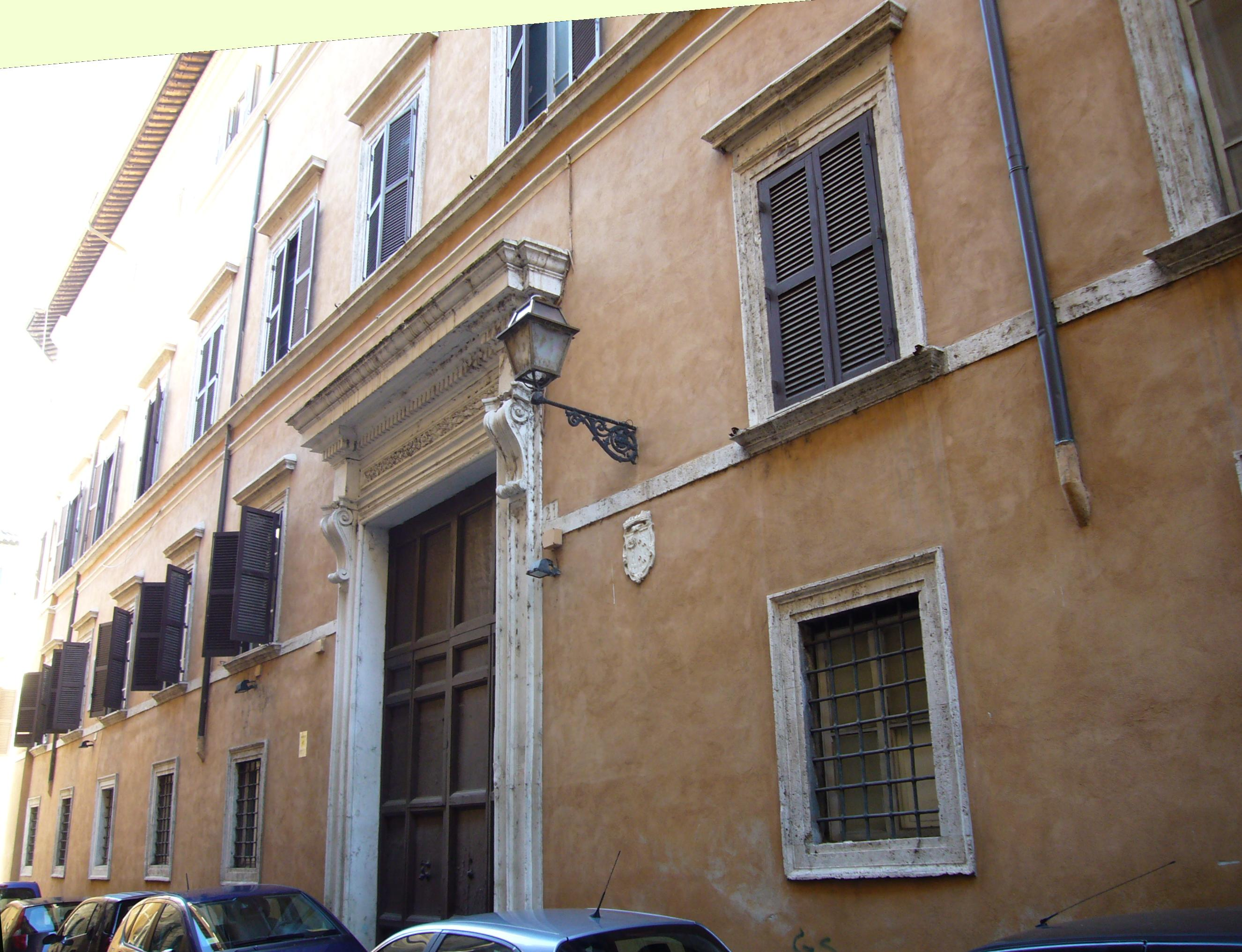
The Palazzo Cesi-Gaddi in which the files were rediscovered in 1994

The Palazzo Cesi-Gaddi war crimes archive or armoire of shame (Italian: armadio della vergogna) is a wooden cabinet discovered in 1994 inside a large storage room in Palazzo Cesi-Gaddi, Rome which, at the time, housed the chancellery of the military attorney's office. The cabinet contained an archive of 695 files documenting war crimes perpetrated on Italian soil under fascist rule and during Nazi occupation after the 8 September 1943 armistice between Italy and Allied armed forces. The actions described in the records spanned several years and took place in various areas of the country, from the southern city of Acerra to the northern province of Trieste and as far east as the Balkans; it remains unclear, to this day, how the archive remained concealed for so long, and who gave the order to hide the files in the immediate post-war period.

== Discovery ==
In 1994, military prosecutor Antonino Intelisano, who was at the time in charge of the trial against former SS officer Erich Priebke, accidentally uncovered the content of the wooden cabinet, which had remained stored for decades, face to the wall, in an unused room in Palazzo Cesi. Its contents had seemingly been placed in the armoire temporarily, probably in the immediate post-war months, and forgotten or (perhaps purposely) overlooked.

The armoire contained the memorandum titled Atrocities in Italy, stamped "secret", which had been compiled by the British Secret Intelligence Service, whose officers had documented the victims' accusations and painstakingly collected depositions, and consigned it to the Italian magistrates, who failed to prosecute the individuals mentioned in the files, limiting publication of details and accusations to the cases against unnamed Nazi and fascist officers.

Information in the files led to judicial proceedings starting (or re-starting) on many specific war crimes, including:

- the Sant'Anna di Stazzema massacre
- the Ardeatine massacre
- the Marzabotto massacre
- the Fragheto massacre
- the massacre at the Korica concentration camp
- the Leros massacre
- the Kos massacre
- the Split massacre
- the massacre at the Duomo in San Miniato
- the Karpathos massacre
- the massacre of the Acqui Division
- the atrocities committed by Michael Seifert at the Bolzano Transit Camp

== See also ==
- Italian war crimes

== Bibliography ==
- Mimmo Franzinelli. Le stragi nascoste. L'armadio della vergogna: impunità e rimozione dei crimini di guerra nazifascisti 1943-2001. Mondadori, Milano, 2003. ISBN 978-88-04-51974-4.
- Franco Giustolisi. L'Armadio della vergogna. Nutrimenti, Roma, 2004. ISBN 978-88-88389-18-9.
- Daniele Biacchessi. Il prezzo dell'ingiustizia in Il paese della vergogna. Milano, Chiarelettere, 2007. ISBN 978-88-6190-006-6.
- Daniele Biacchessi. Orazione civile per la Resistenza, Bologna, Promomusic, 2012.
