= Caiazzo massacre =

German killing of 22 Italian citizens during World War II

- Part of War crimes of the Wehrmacht
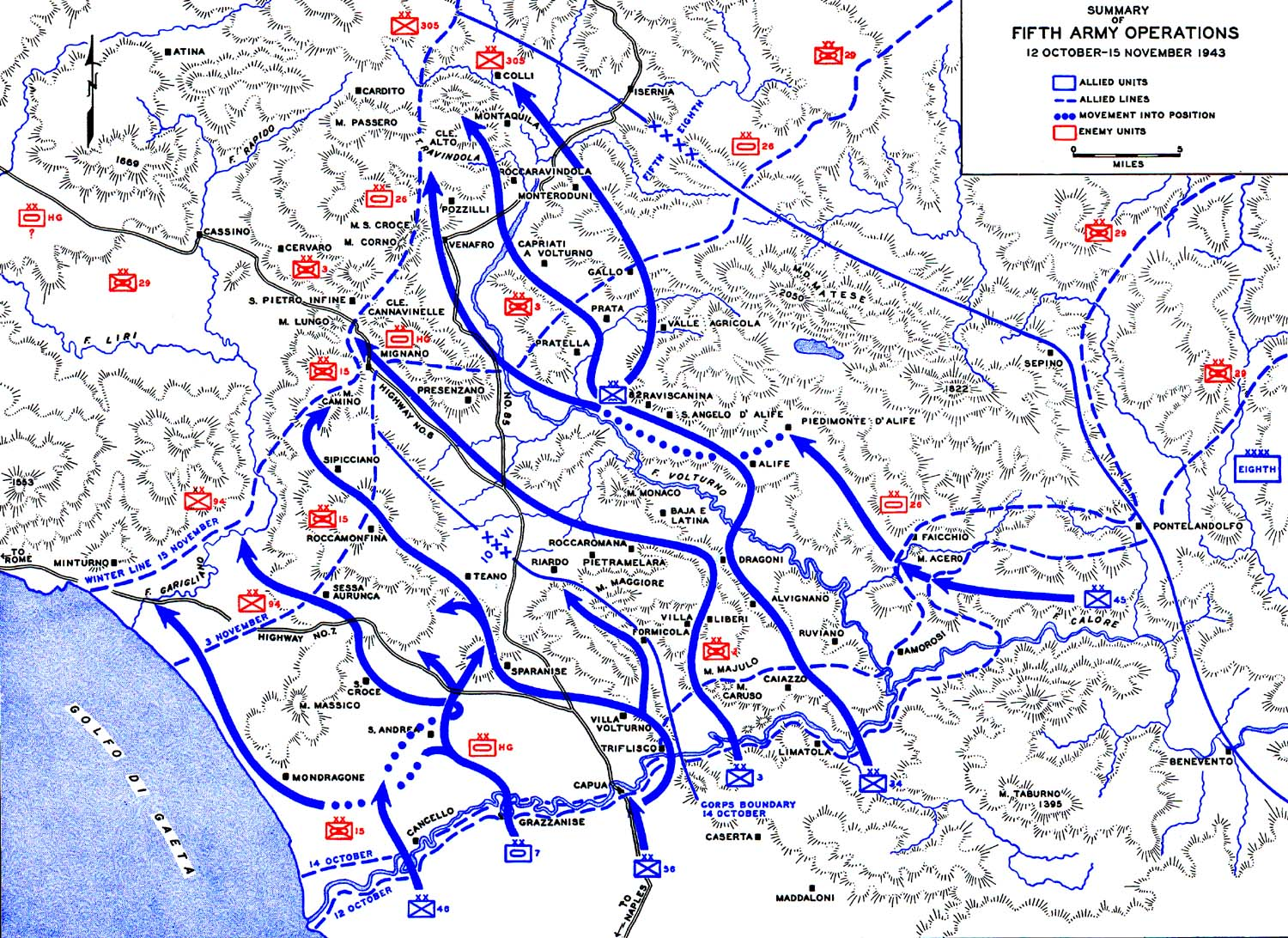
- Operations of the U.S. Fifth Army against the Volturno Line with Caiazzo at the bottom centre
- Native name: Eccidio di Caiazzo
- Location: 41°10′N 14°21′E; Caiazzo, Campania, Italy
- Date: 13 October 1943
- Target: Italian civilian population
- Attack type: Massacre
- Weapons: Hand grenades, Bayonets, Fire arms
- Deaths: 22
- Perpetrators: Wolfgang Lehnigk-Emden, Kurt Schuster
- Motive: Alleged signaling to enemy forces
- Charges: Murder
- Verdict: Life imprisonment
- Convicted: Lehnigk-Emden, Schuster

The Caiazzo massacre (Italian: Eccidio di Caiazzo, German: Massaker von Caiazzo) was the massacre of 22 Italian civilians at Caiazzo, Campania, Southern Italy, on 13 October 1943, during World War II by members of the German 3rd Panzergrenadier Division. The massacre was described as having been of a particularly brutal nature and its leader, Lieutenant Wolfgang Lehnigk-Emden, was soon after captured by Allied forces. Lehnigk-Emden confessed to part of the crime but was later accidentally released and, for the next four decades, was not put on trial.

In 1994 an Italian court sentenced Lehnigk-Emden and a non-commissioned officer of the division, Kurt Schuster, to life imprisonment in absentia, but neither was extradited by Germany. Lehnigk-Emden was also put on trial in Germany in a case that went to the high court, the Bundesgerichtshof; he was found guilty but released as the statute of limitations had expired. This caused considerable outrage in both Germany and Italy because of the particularly brutal nature of the crime.

== Massacre ==
On 13 October 1943, the day Italy declared war on Nazi Germany, German forces were retreating from the area around the Volturno river. At Monte Carmignano the 3rd Company of the 29th Panzergrenadier regiment had been taking defensive positions, part of the Volturno Line, and were under threat by advancing American forces. The German units in the area feared attacks by local partisans and reacted with violence, resulting in the execution of 33 local civilians in the period between 2 and 13 October, the worst of those incidents being the Caiazzo massacre.

In the evening Lehnigk-Emden spotted what he perceived to be secret signals from a large farmhouse nearby the advancing Americans. Lehnigk-Emden, who was not particularly well-respected by his soldiers, entered the farmhouse with a few of them to find 22 peasants from four different families hiding there from the anticipated fighting. His company commander, Draschke, ordered the execution of the four heads of the families. This order was carried out, as well as the shooting of three women who tried to prevent the German soldiers from doing so. Lehnigk-Emden confessed during captivity that he was part of this execution commando, whose deed was classified as manslaughter by the German courts.

Following this, Lehnigk-Emden and two sergeants, one of them Kurt Schuster, returned to the farmhouse where the remaining 15 women and children were hiding. They threw hand grenades through the window and shot and bayoneted survivors trying to escape. Wilhelm May, a German soldier who was not involved in the second part of the massacre, later testified as a witness to the events that women and children were brutally murdered.

== Aftermath ==
=== Capture and escape ===
Lehnigk-Emden and members of his company were captured by American forces on 4 November 1943 and immediately questioned about the massacre by German-born journalist Hans Habe. At an interview in a prisoner-of-war camp in Aversa, Italy, Lehnigk-Emden confessed to having participated in the first part of the massacre, but denied his involvement in the second part. In 1944, while a prisoner of war in a special camp for war criminals in Algeria, Lehnigk-Emden showed no remorse for his actions but instead told another German POW that, had he known he was going to be jailed for his actions, he would have killed more. He attempted escape but was wounded and, eventually, taken to Europe on a British hospital ship. He was accidentally discharged in Göttingen.

=== Post-war life ===
In post-war Germany, Lehnigk-Emden worked as an architect and lived, from 1950, in Ochtendung, near Koblenz. He was considered a good citizen and active in the local carnival club. He joined the Social Democratic Party of Germany. He and his family took holidays in northern Italy but he never mentioned the events of Caiazzo. After the court cases, Lehnigk-Emden continued to live in Ochtendung, where his grandchildren were active in events organised with the twinning of Caiazzo and Ochtendung.

=== Search ===
At the time of his discharge from captivity, Allied authorities were already trying to track down Lehnigk-Emden, as he was meant to appear at an inquiry into the massacre. However, they were searching for the wrong name, Wolfgang Lemick. The error was made by a US Army clerk.

In 1969, Simon Wiesenthal made an attempt to find Lehnigk-Emden, seeking information from the relevant German authorities in Ludwigsburg. He was unsuccessful as he had been given an incorrect name, searching for Lemick Emden. The state prosecutor in Munich also investigated the matter but, like Wiesenthal, searched under the wrong name.

In 1988, Giuseppe Agnone, a resident of Caiazzo who had emigrated to the United States, searched the relevant documents, now declassified, in the United States National Archives and was successful in identifying Lehnigk-Emden's correct name. He forwarded this information to Interpol. Shortly before his 70th birthday, on 15 October 1992, Lehnigk-Emden was arrested at his home by the German police.

=== Trials ===
==== Italy ====
In 1946, the documents relating to the inquiry into the massacre were handed over to Italian authorities but, like so many, the files were placed in the Palazzo Cesi-Gaddi war crimes archive and only rediscovered in 1994. In 1991 the Public Prosecutor's Office in Santa Maria Capua Vetere opened an investigation at about the same time authorities in Germany began investigating the case. On 25 October 1994, the court in Santa Maria Capua Vetere sentenced Schuster and Lehnigk-Emden to life in prison in absentia but neither was extradited or served any time.

==== Germany ====
In 1993, Lehnigk-Emden was put on trial at the state court of Koblenz for the murder of fifteen civilians, as the court classified the killing of the remaining seven as manslaughter. The court in Koblenz eventually dismissed the charges on 18 January 1994 on the grounds that the statute of limitations had expired, and declined to extradite Lehnigk-Emden. The case progressed as far as the German high court, the Bundesgerichtshof, which confirmed the ruling of the court in Koblenz and let Lehnigk-Emden go free. At the same time, the ruling judge stated that the crime was so terrible it would even have resulted in a conviction in a Nazi court. Germany abolished its statute of limitations laws for murder in 1969, but the case had been tried under the old laws.

== Commemoration ==
The massacre remains strong in the mind of the community of Caiazzo. Flowers are regularly laid at the scene and schoolchildren are told about it from a young age. However, the local priest at the time, Don Gerardo Fava, stated in 1993 that the community did not seek revenge, only justice.

In 1995, Lehnigk-Emden apologized for his actions, blaming them on the chaotic situation near the front lines and his youth and inexperience. This apology was not accepted by Nicola Sorbo, the mayor of Caiazzo, who suggested that if Lehnigk-Emden was sincere in his repentance, he would return to Italy to face the courts. Lehnigk-Emden's hometown, Ochtendung, was branded as a "Nazi village", but, in 1995, entered a town twinning agreement with Caiazzo, which had been suggested by the latter.

In December 2017, it was announced that the German embassy had approved €30,000 in funding for a museum in Caiazzo commemorating the massacre.
