= Vinca massacre =

1944 massacre in Tuscany, Italy

- Part of War crimes of the Wehrmacht
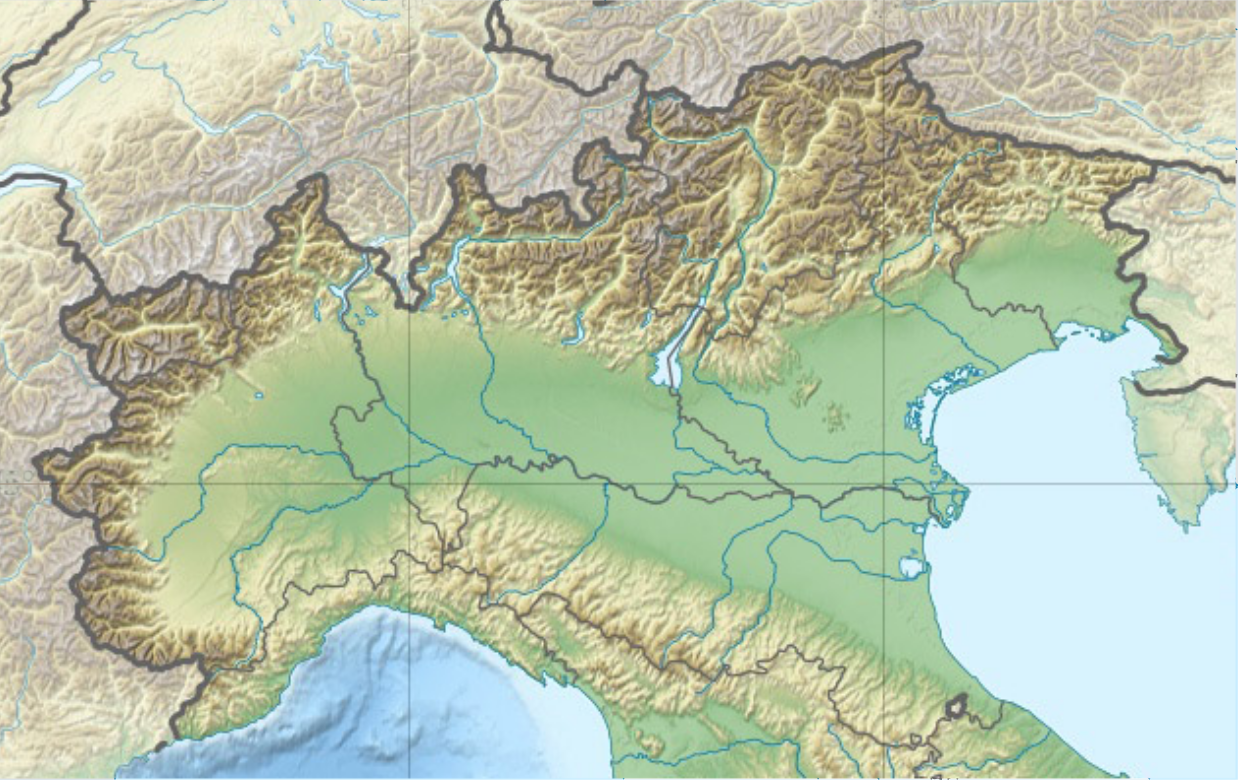
- Vinca massacre (Northern Italy)
- Native name: Eccidio di Vinca
- Location: 44°14′N 10°08′E; Vinca (Fivizzano), Tuscany, Italy
- Date: 24–27 August 1944
- Target: Italian civilian population
- Attack type: Massacre
- Weapon: Machine guns
- Deaths: 162
- Perpetrators: Max Simon, Walter Reder
- Motive: Reprisal for Italian partisan activity
- Charges: Murder
- Verdict: Life imprisonment
- Convicted: Max Simon, Walter Reder

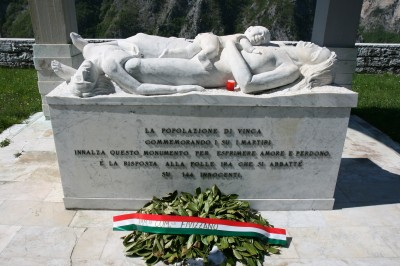
Monument to the victims of the massacre at the Vinca cemetery

The Vinca massacre (Italian: Eccidio di Vinca) was a massacre carried out near Fivizzano, Tuscany, by the German 16th SS Panzergrenadier Division from 24 to 27 August 1944 in which 162 Italian civilians were killed.

It was one of many war crimes the division was involved in while stationed in Italy during the war.

== Massacre ==
In August 1944 the German LXXV Army Corps responsible for the protection of the western part of the Gothic Line experienced increased partisan activity in the Apuan Alps. On 18 August a German officer was killed by partisans. The 16th SS Panzergrenadier Division, commanded by Max Simon who was convicted after the war for his involvement in the Marzabotto massacre, was tasked with an anti-partisan operation to clear out the region of partisans. After meticulous planning, and with the help of the Italian Fascist collaborators Black Brigades, the SS-Panzer-Aufklärungs-Abteilung 16, under the command of Walter Reder, as well as other German SS and Wehrmacht support units, began the operation on 24 August.

The Germans burnt villages and destroyed churches in the vicinity of Fivizzano for the next three days from 24 to 27 August. The villages of Gragnola, Monzone Alto, Equi Terme, Corsano, Lorano, Tenerano, Gallogna, Campiglione, Viano, Vezzanello, Cecina, Terma, Posterla and Colla were attacked. Converging at Vinca, the German soldiers used machine guns and grenades to massacre civilians (mostly women, children and elderly) who were hiding in the woods and caves and could not escape.

After an encounter with local partisans on the 26 August, the German troops returned to Vinca the following day. Those civilians who had returned to the village were massacred and Vinca destroyed. Overall, in the three days the 16th SS Panzergrenadier Division operated in the area 162 civilians had been killed by the division.

== Aftermath ==
Together with the massacres of Bardine and Bergiola Foscalina, the massacre of Vinca was among the indictments in the British trial against General Max Simon (1899–1961) at Padua in May and June 1947. Simon was sentenced to life imprisonment but pardoned in 1954.

In 1951 Walter Reder (1915–1991) was sentenced to life imprisonment by a military court in Bologna for the massacres of Vinca and Marzabotto. In 1985 Reder received an amnesty and was released.

A number of German SS soldiers were tried in absentia in 2009 and found guilty but did not serve time.

Colonel Giulio Lodovici, leader of the Italian collaborationists, was arrested in 1948, brought to trial and released because of a lack of evidence. All told, 64 members of the Black Brigades were sentenced to life imprisonment or lengthy prison sentences for the Vinca massacre but, because of a general amnesty in 1946, all were released a short time after.

== In popular culture ==
In 2018 the joint Italian-German documentary The name of the father directed by Daniele Ceccarini, Paola Settimini, Mario Molinari,(Italian: Il nome del padre) was produced. It tells the true story of the son of Josef Maier, Udo Surer, a German lawyer from Bavaria, who discovered in 2004 that his father was involved in the Vinca and San Terenzo Monti massacres.
