= Heinrich Andergassen =

SS officer and convicted war criminal (1908–1946)

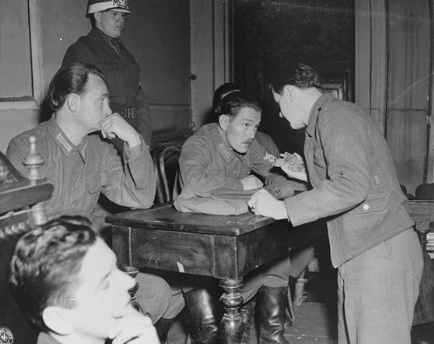
Andergassen during his trial in Naples, 15 January 1946

Heinrich Andergassen (30 July 1908 – 26 July 1946) was an Austrian-born German member of the Nazi Party, engineer, Schutzstaffel (SS) officer, and convicted war criminal. Andergassen was sentenced to death and subsequently executed for the torture and murder of seven Allied prisoners of war and members of the Italian resistance.

== Early life and career ==
Andergassen was born on 30 July 1908 in Hall in Tirol, Tyrol (then part of Austria-Hungary), and trained as a machinist at Swarovski in Wattens. In 1929, he enlisted in the Austrian Federal Army, undergoing training at the Arsenal in Vienna, and was appointed as a gendarme in the Austrian Gendarmerie in 1937. Following the 1938 Anschluss, Andergassen became a member of the NSDAP and joined the Gestapo.

During the German occupation of the Sudetenland in October 1938, Andergassen served in a 100-strong police detachment, after which he worked as a Gestapo official in Innsbruck. He was later transferred to Italy as a Sicherheitsdienst (SD) officer and stationed in Merano. On the night of 15 September 1943, he led a raid resulting in the arrest of 25 Jewish residents of Merano. Andergassen detained them in a basement that had been converted into a temporary jail before deporting them to the Reichenau camp near Innsbruck, Austria, from where they were transported to the Auschwitz concentration camp. Only one of the deportees, Valeska von Hoffmann, survived the Holocaust.

During his deployment in Northern Italy, Andergassen held the rank of Sturmscharführer and was later promoted to Untersturmführer.

== War crimes ==
On 15 December 1944, the SS captured Manlio Longon, a leader of the Comitato di Liberazione Nazionale within the Italian Resistance in Alto Adige. Under the orders of August Schiffer, Longon was tortured and subsequently hanged by Andergassen at the Bolzano Army Corps headquarters on 1 January 1945.

On 26 January 1945, OSS Captain Roderick Stephen Hall, who had been operating behind enemy lines in occupied Italy for several months, was captured by the SS in Cortina d'Ampezzo and transferred to the Gestapo headquarters in Bolzano. On 19 February 1945, Hall was executed by Andergassen and accompanying SS personnel.

== Arrest, trial, and execution ==
On 30 April 1945, as Allied forces advanced, Andergassen fled toward Brennero alongside Schiffer and their driver, Albert Storz, in a black Mercedes. On 8 May, Andergassen, Schiffer, and Storz were captured by the 206th Counterintelligence Corps detachment outside Innsbruck.

Andergassen, Schiffer, Storz, and Gestapo officer Hans Butz were collectively charged with war crimes. During the trial, held by a U.S. military tribunal in Naples, Andergassen provided a voluntary statement asserting that the execution of Roderick Hall had been sanctioned by higher Nazi authorities.

On 16 January 1946, Andergassen, Schiffer, and Storz were sentenced to death by hanging for the torture and killing of Hall, four other American personnel, and two British soldiers. Butz received a life sentence due to his limited involvement and lack of direct participation in the murders. On 26 July 1946, Andergassen, Schiffer, and Storz were executed at a military stockade in Livorno.

== Postwar reception ==
Following the war, Arthur Schuster, a Criminal Investigation Department Commissioner in the province of Bolzano, described Andergassen as "the incarnation of sadism and brutality." Schuster noted that Andergassen "was incredibly blood-thirsty, especially when under the influence of strong drink, for which he had a great fondness, and was encouraged in all his excesses by his superior," August Schiffer.

== Sources ==
- CIA. 2010 Featured Story Archive. Roderick Stephen Hall: The Saboteur of Brenner Pass. 27 October 2019.
- CIA. Historical Review Program. Release in Full Sept. 22, 1993. Roderick "Steve" Hall. 27 October 2019.
- Quibble, Anthony. Fall 1967: 4-41-1: Roderick "Steve" Hall (An Alpine Tragedy During the Last Convulsions of World War II). Fall 1967: 4-41-1. 27 October 2019.
- United States Holocaust Memorial Museum, courtesy of National Archives and Records Administration, College Park. Photo Defendant Heinrich Andergassen confers with the interpreter for the defense during his trial as an accused war criminal. 27 October 2019.
- German Federal Archive. Berlin. Heinrich Andergassen. Documents.
- Lingen, Kerstin von: Conspiracy of Silence: How the "Old Boys" of American Intelligence Shielded SS General Karl Wolff from Prosecution. In: Holocaust and Genocide Studies. Vol. 22.1. 2008. pp. 74–109.. 27 October 2019.
- New York Times: "Confess Killing Fliers: Germans on Trial in Naples for Murder of Americans." 11 Jan 1946, p. 2.
- The Washington Post: "Tell of Four U.S. Fliers' Death." 11 Jan 1946, p. 9.
- Chicago Daily Tribune: "3 Nazis to hang for Murder of 7 Allied Troops." 16 Jan 1946, p. 12.
- New York Times: "3 Gestapo Men to Hang: Naples Court Gives Verdict in Murder of 7 Allied Soldiers." 16 Jan 1946, p. 7.
- New York Times: "Germans incensed at U.S.-Danes Pact: Germans charged with killing Allied Men in Italy." 3 Feb 1946, p. 12.
- Los Angeles Times: "S.S. Torture Trio Hanged." 27 July 1946, p. 5.
- New York Times: "3 S.S. Officers Hanged: Trio Convicted of Torture-Killing of 7 Allied Soldiers in Italy." 27 July 1946, p. 5.
- DerStandard. Wissenschaft. Welt. Der Hofer war's. 10.09.2002. 27 October 2019.
