= Roderick Stephen Hall =

American military officer (1915–1945)

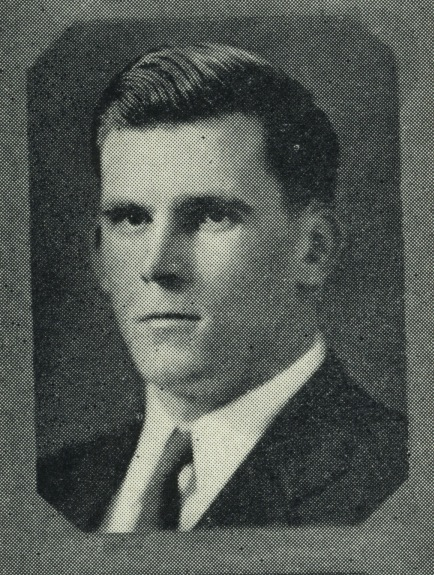
- Born: Roderick Stephen Goodspeed Hall; August 12, 1915; Beijing, Republic of China
- Died: February 20, 1945 (aged 29); Bolzano Transit Camp, Bolzano, Italian Social Republic
- Cause of death: Execution by hanging
- Burial place: Florence American Cemetery
- Military career
- Allegiance: United States
- Branch: Office of Strategic Services
- Service years: 1941–1945
- Rank: Captain
- Service number: O1114150
- Unit: 2677th OSS Regiment
- Conflicts: Italian Campaign
- Awards: Legion of Merit Purple Heart

Captain Roderick Stephen Goodspeed Hall (August 12, 1915 – February 20, 1945) was an American military officer and agent of the Office of Strategic Services (OSS) during World War II. Hall was betrayed and captured behind enemy lines during a self-proposed sabotage mission in the region south of the Brenner Pass in January 1945. After one month of captivity he was executed by the Schutzstaffel (SS), who covered up his murder as a cardiac arrest. His murderers were put on trial by a U.S. military tribunal after the war. Three of them were sentenced to death and executed, while a fourth was sentenced to life in prison.

== Pre-war life ==
Hall was born in 1915 in Beijing in what was then the Republic of China. His father, Ray Ovid Hall (1891–1951), was an international business man and his mother, Gertrude Cliff (Goodspeed) Hall (1881–1964), was a doctor. He attended Phillips Academy in Andover, Massachusetts, and graduated in 1934. He travelled internationally and visited the Italian Alps and, especially, the area around the Brenner Pass, where he spent his time climbing, hiking and skiing, becoming very familiar with the area. By profession, Hall was a geologist.

When Japan attacked Pearl Harbor on 7 December 1941 and the United States was drawn into the war, Hall had just returned to the U.S. from his travels and had enrolled at Yale University.

== Mission ==
=== Preparation ===
Hall dropped out of university and enlisted as a private, quickly rising through the ranks, eventually being promoted to Second Lieutenant. Recognizing the strategic importance of the Brenner Pass for the supply of the German and Italian forces in the Mediterranean, Hall wrote a letter to the OSS in autumn 1943, proposing a mission against the pass.

In his letter he volunteered to parachute into northern Italy, in the area west of Cortina d'Ampezzo, around the Falzarego Pass, with tools, supplies and explosives. From there he would either single-handedly or with the help of local resistance attack the minor roads and passes in the region leading up to Brenner Pass to disrupt Axis supply routes. He was aware that his chances of withdrawal from the region were slim but hoped to hide out in the area until the end of the war.

To his surprise the letter aroused the interest of the Special Operations branch of the OSS, responsible, among other things, for sabotage. Hall was ordered to report to Washington. He received his initial training in the U.S. and was then sent to Algiers, North Africa, as a demolitions expert. A mission directly against the Brenner Pass was seen as unrealistic, partly because local partisan support seemed unlikely given that the inhabitants of the region of South Tyrol, also part of Italy, were predominantly ethnic Germans.

In June 1944 Hall was sent to Caserta, Italy, where he joined the 2677th OSS Regiment, and trained with a team of agents for his mission. Hall briefly returned to Algiers for a parachuting course before embarking with his team to the Italian mountains for language and survival skills training.

=== Mission behind enemy lines ===
On 2 August 1944 Hall and his team parachuted into northern Italy, being dropped at Monte Pala, 85 miles south of the Brenner Pass. The group consisted of Captain Lloyd G. Smith, its commander, First Lieutenant Joseph Lukitsch, Hall, radio operator Stanley Sbeig, a Navy specialist, and Technician third grade Victor Malaspino.

They damaged an unguarded bridge at Tolmezzo with explosives and continued to do so on smaller bridges while travelling north. Severe weather conditions hampered the efforts and the team was eventually forced to hide out in a small village, with Hall suffering from severe frostbite on his feet, hoping to hide out there until the end of the war.

Apart from sabotage Hall was also engaged in contacting local Italian partisan groups, organising supply drop offs and gaining intelligence on the Alpine Fortress, a German fortification project.

=== Capture ===
On 25 January 1945 Hall went north again, now on his own and on skis, with orders to blow up the dam at Cortina d' Ampezzo. The next day, unable to move because of the effects of frostbite on his feet, Hall was discovered by a game warden. Hall hid with a local priest but the game warden, under the pretext of getting help, turned him over to the local Fascist police. Hall was subsequently betrayed by one of his own partisans who identified him as an OSS agent. Hall did not resist his captors, two police officers from Cortina, and was eventually handed over to the SS in Bolzano.

== Murder ==
Hall was handed over to the SS who ran the Bolzano transit camp, where he was tortured. He was hanged in the torture chamber of the camp on 20 February 1945, but his death was covered up to appear as a cardiac arrest. The Italian doctor who signed the death certificate was a prisoner himself and was not actually permitted to see the body. During negotiations in Switzerland between high ranking SS officials and U.S. representatives, Operation Sunrise, the latter demanded for Hall to be exchanged or freed as a token of good will, but he was already dead at this point.

Two other OSS agents captured around the time at Belluno were destined to suffer the same fate as Hall, but were rescued when the U.S., through channels in Switzerland, informed the German high command that they expected the prisoners to be treated in accordance with the Geneva convention as they had been captured in uniform, thereby saving their lives.

== Trial ==
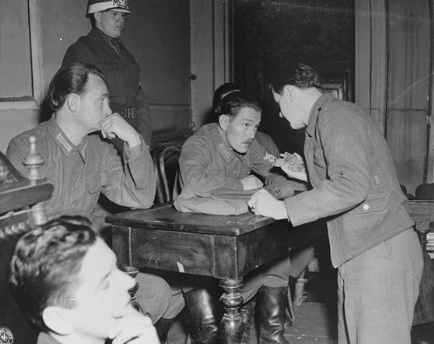
Heinrich Andergassen during his trial

As Hall had been in uniform at the time of his capture, his execution had been in contravention of the Geneva Convention, making it a war crime. When OSS officers entered the camp at the end of the war they managed to identify Hall's grave, giving him a proper military burial. The records found at the camp served as evidence at the trial in Naples in 1946. Untersturmführer Heinrich Andergassen, one of the chief suspects for the murder, confessed to the murder during interrogation on July 1, 1945 and implicated three others, Sturmbannführer August Schiffer, Oberscharführer Albert Storz and Gendarmerie officer Hans Butz in his confession. Schiffer unsuccessfully used the infamous Commando Order as defence for his actions.

On January 16, 1946, Andergassen, Schiffer, and Storz were sentenced to death by an American military tribunal. They were hanged on July 26 of the same year. Butz was sentenced to life in prison due to his more limited involvement. Apart from the murder of Hall, Andergassen, Schiffer, and Storz were also found guilty of the murders of six other Allied servicemen, pilot Charles Parker, SAS officers Roger Littlejohn and David Crowley, and U.S. airmen George Hammond, Hardy Narron, and Medard Tafoya.

== Recognition ==
Captain Roderick Stephen Hall was posthumously awarded the Legion of Merit, "for exceptionally meritorious conduct in the performance of outstanding services in Italy from 2 August 1944 to 27 January 1945".

Hall, who also received the Purple Heart for having been killed, is buried at the Florence American Cemetery and Memorial in Florence, Tuscany.

== Bibliography ==
- Steinacher, Gerald (1999). ""In der Bozner Zelle erhängt…": Roderick Hall — Einziges Ein-Mann-Unternehmen des amerikanischen Kriegsgeheimdienstes in Südtirol" ["Hung in a cell in Bolzano...": Roderick Hall - The only one-man operation of the OSS in South Tyrol] (in German). University of Nebraska–Lincoln.
- Gerald Steinacher (2000). Suedtirol und die Geheimdienste 1943-1945. Studienverlag. ISBN 978-3-7065-1346-3.
- Patrick K. O'Donnell (2008). The Brenner Assignment: The Untold Story of the Most Daring Spy Mission of World War II. Da Capo Press. ISBN 978-0-7867-2651-6.
- Patrick Hans-Joachim Löwer (2023). Als Saboteur zum Brennerpass: Das Partisanen-Abenteuer des US-Agenten Roderick Hall 1944/45. Athesia-Tappeiner Verlag. ISBN 978-88-6839-768-5.
