= Guardistallo massacre =

Nazi German massacre near Guardistallo, Tuscany in 1944

The Guardistallo massacre was a Nazi German act of reprisal that took place close to Guardistallo, in Tuscany. On 29 June 1944, 57 people were killed and buried in a mass grave. One of the victims died from wounds suffered in the same occasion a few days afterward.

The cause of the massacre was suspected at the time to be a belief by German forces that Italian partisans had been hiding an American pilot who had been shot down in the area. A photoreconnaissance pilot from the 3rd Photorecon Group, 12th Air Force had, in fact, been downed by antiaircraft fire in the proceeding days and hidden by a resistance cell. He was successfully returned to Allied forces and survived the war.
