= 3rd Infantry Division (Wehrmacht) =

3rd Motorized Infantry Division 3rd Panzergrenadier Division
- German: 3. Infanterie-Division (mot.); 3. Panzergrenadier-Division
- Unit insignia
- Active: 1 October 1934 – 2 February 1943; 1 March 1943 – 21 April 1945
- Country: Nazi Germany
- Branch: German Army
- Type: Panzergrenadier
- Role: Maneuver warfare Raiding
- Size: Division
- Garrison/HQ: Frankfurt (Oder)
- Engagements: World War II

The 3rd Infantry Division was an infantry division of the German Army that fought in World War II. The division was established under the cover name Wehrgauleitung Frankfurt in 1934 by expanding the 3rd Division of the Reichswehr. It was redesignated Kommandant von Frankfurt shortly afterward, and took on its bona fide name when the formation of the Wehrmacht was announced in October 1935. In March 1939 the division took part in the invasion and occupation of Czechoslovakia.

During World War II the division took part in the invasion of Poland in September 1939 where it was part of the German 4th Army. It then took part in the invasion of France in May 1940. In October that year it returned to Germany and was upgraded to a fully motorized division. (Most German divisions during the war had no transport for the infantry and used horses to tow their artillery; German industry could not turn out sufficient motor transport while also trying to meet other military requirements.)

Redesignated the 3rd Motorized Infantry Division it took part in Operation Barbarossa in June 1941, advancing on Leningrad under Army Group North. In October the division was transferred to Army Group Center for Operation Typhoon and the Battle of Moscow and the defensive battles of the winter. In mid-1942 it was transferred to Army Group South to take part in the summer offensive Fall Blau ("Case Blue"), and was ultimately caught up in the Battle of Stalingrad, where it was destroyed in the encirclement with the German 6th Army in February 1943.

It was reconstituted as the 3rd Panzergrenadier Division in March, absorbing the 386th Motorized Division in the process. It then fought on the Italian Front until the summer of 1944, when it was transferred to the Western Front to help re-establish the front line after the Allied breakout from the Normandy beachhead. Later in the year, it participated in the Battle of the Bulge and then in the defensive actions at Remagen. During this battle, several dozen soldiers of the division were killed in the Chenogne massacre. The division surrendered in the Ruhr Pocket in April 1945, shortly before Victory in Europe Day.

== Commanding officers ==
=== 3rd Infantry Division ===
- Oberst Curt Haase, 4 April 1934 – 3 July 1936
- Generalmajor Walter Petzel, 3 July 1936 – 11 October 1938
- Generalleutnant Walter Lichel, 11 October 1938 – 1 October 1940

=== 3rd Infantry Division (mot.) ===
- General der Artillerie Paul Bader, 1 October 1940 – 25 May 1941
- General der Artillerie Curt Jahn, 25 May 1941 – 1 April 1942
- Generalleutnant Helmuth Schlömer, 1 April 1942 – 15 January 1943
- Oberst i. G. Jobst Freiherr von Hanstein, 15 January 1943 – 28 January 1943

=== 3rd Panzergrenadier-Division ===
- General der Panzertruppe Fritz-Hubert Gräser, 1 March 1943 – March 1944
- Generalmajor Hans Hecker, March 1944 – 1 June 1944
- Generalleutnant Hans-Günther von Rost, 1 June 1944 – 25 June 1944
- Generalleutnant Walter Denkert, 25 June 1944 – April 1945

== War crimes ==
The division has been implicated in a number of war crimes in Italy between September 1943 and August 1944. It is estimated that the division massacre roughly 200 Italian civilians during this time period. After the division moved to France, it continued to commit war crimes, including the massacre of 86 civilians in Couvonges.

Two members of the division, Lieutenant Wolfgang Lehnigk-Emden and NCO Kurt Schuster were sentenced to life in prison in absentia by an Italian court for their role in the Caiazzo massacre, the murder of twenty-two civilians at Caiazzo, near Naples, in October 1943 but not extradited. Lehnigk-Emden was captured by Allied forces during the war, confessed the crime but then released by accident. He was found guilty of manslaughter by the Bundesgerichtshof , Germany's highest court but released because of the Statute of limitations had expired. This caused considerable outrage in both Germany and Italy because of the particularly brutal nature of the crime, and was seen as a Miscarriage of justice.

== Organization ==
1934 Order of Battle

- Frankfurt Infanterie Regiment
  - I. Battalion
  - II. Battalion
  - III. Battalion
- Crossen Infanterie Regiment
  - I. Battalion
  - II. Battalion
  - III. Battalion
- Frankfurt / Oder Artillerie Regiment
  - I. Battalion
  - II. Battalion
  - III. Battalion
  - IV. Battalion
- Küstrin Engineer Battalion
  - I. Kompanie
  - II. Kompanie
  - III. Kompanie
- Potsdam Support Division Group
  - Signals Detachment
