= Max Simon =

German SS general and convicted war criminal (1899–1961)

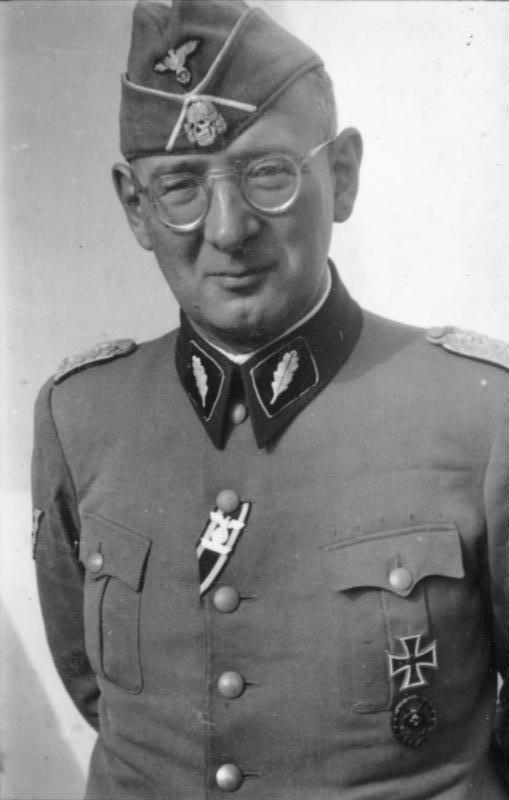
- Simon in 1940
- Born: 6 January 1899; Breslau, Province of Silesia, Kingdom of Prussia, German Empire
- Died: 1 February 1961 (aged 62); Lünen, North Rhine-Westphalia, West Germany
- Military career
- Allegiance: German Empire; Weimar Republic; Nazi Germany
- Branch: Imperial German Army; Freikorps; Reichswehr; Allgemeine SS; Waffen-SS
- Service years: 1917–1945
- Rank: SS-Gruppenführer
- Units: SS Division Totenkopf; SS Division Reichsführer-SS; XIII SS Corps
- Conflicts: World War I; Macedonia; Western Front; World War II; Battle of France; Operation Barbarossa
- Awards: Iron Cross; Hungarian Order of Merit; Order of the Crown of Italy; German Cross in Gold; Knight's Cross of the Iron Cross with Oak Leaves

Max Otto Simon (6 January 1899 – 1 February 1961) was a German SS commander and war criminal during World War II. Simon was one of the first members of the SS in the early 1930s. He rose through the ranks of the SS, and became a corps commander during World War II. After the war, Simon was convicted for his role in the Marzabotto massacre and the Sant'Anna di Stazzema massacre. Initially sentenced to death, his sentence was reduced to life imprisonment, and he was released in 1954. Despite being tried three more times in a West German court for war crimes, he was acquitted and died a free man in 1961.

== Early career ==
Simon was born in Breslau in January 1899. In 1917, he joined the army and served as a nurse (Krankenpfleger) in the medical service in various army ambulance battalions on the Eastern Front, in Macedonia and on the Western Front, being awarded the Iron Cross 2nd class and the Bulgarian Soldier Cross of Bravery.

On 9 January 1919, Simon was transferred to the 4th Squadron of the Life-Kürassier Regiment "Großer Kurfürst" (Silesian) No. 1. With this regiment, he participated in the border protection of Silesia as part of the Freikorps until his discharge on 20 October 1919 earning both classes of the Silesian Eagle.

From 22 October to 28 December 1919, he worked as a freight yard worker for the Reichsbahn before rejoining military service with his old regiment and once again serving in the border guard (Grenzschutz). Gefreiter Simon was promoted to Unteroffizier on 24 March 1920. After his regiment was disbanded, he was transferred to the Reichswehr in Hofgeismar, where he served in the 2nd Squadron of the 16th Cavalry Regiment from 1 June 1920. He was promoted to Wachtmeister on 1 November 1924. In 1928, he was appointed company sergeant major (Spieß) of the 3rd Squadron and retired on 4 September 1929 to take up a position in the public service.

On 1 October 1932, he joined the NSDAP (#1,359,576) and on 16 January 1933 the Allgemeine SS (#83,086). He was assigned to the 1st Sturm/I. Sturmbann/147th SS-Standarte in Gera. On 15 April 1934, he was transferred to a SS Special Detachment which would become a part of the new SS-Verfügungstruppe in September 1934. He was promoted to SS-Untersturmführer (Second Lieutenant) on 9 November 1934. In October 1934, he had been appointed commander of the SS guard force in Sachsenburg and at the same time deputy commandant of the Sachsenburg concentration camp. On 10 July 1937, he was appointed commander of the 1st SS Totenkopfstandarte Oberbayern. In 1938, he took part in the Anschluss of Austria, the occupation of Bohemia and Moravia and the occupation of the Sudetenland.

== World War II ==
After the start of World War II, the 1st SS Totenkopfstandarte Oberbayern would become the SS-Totenkopf-Infanterie-Regiment 1 of the SS Division Totenkopf on 16 October 1939 and was later renamed the SS Panzer Grenadier Regiment 5 "Thule" in 1942. During the Battle of France, Simon led his regiment in the capture of Pixie, Lyon, Orléans, Tours and Bordeaux and then advanced to the border with Spain.

In July 1941, Simon took part in the invasion of Soviet Union, Operation Barbarossa, as part of Army Group North, taking Kraslava and breaking through the Stalin Line, where Simon was wounded. For the fighting in the Battles of the Demyansk Pocket, Simon was awarded the Knight's Cross and promoted to SS-Oberführer (Senior Colonel). In December 1942 Simon was promoted again to SS-Brigadeführer (Brigadier General), prior to being given command of the SS Division Reichsführer-SS.

The SS Division Reichsführer-SS was to be formed in Hungary from Simon's old regiment and the Sturmbrigade Reichsführer SS. In 1944, the division was moved to Italy, and fought, never complete, at Anzio and later in the Arno sector, where it gained a reputation for stability although it suffered heavy losses during the battles in the Apennines. The division also fought against partisans behind the lines, perpetrating several major atrocities against civilians (Sant'Anna di Stazzema massacre and Marzabotto massacre), for which Simon was awarded the Oakleaves for the Knight's Cross and the German Cross in Gold, in October 1944.

On 24 October with effect from 1 November 1944, Simon was appointed commanding general of the XIII SS Corps. The XIII SS Corps deployed to the Lorraine region against the United States Army, and from December 1944 defended the Siegfried Line.

The XIII SS Army Corps retreated into the Saarland and the Palatinate where it started to destroy the Rhine bridges. In April 1945, between Main and Jagst, it came up against the 4th US Armored Division and took part in heavy fighting around the Tauber – Colombia line and around Würzburg and Nuremberg. The Corps then fought a withdrawal to the Danube and around Munich. On the orders of Simon the bridges over the Isar approaching Austria were not blown up, as he believed there was no need as the end of the war was near.

== Killings in Brettheim ==
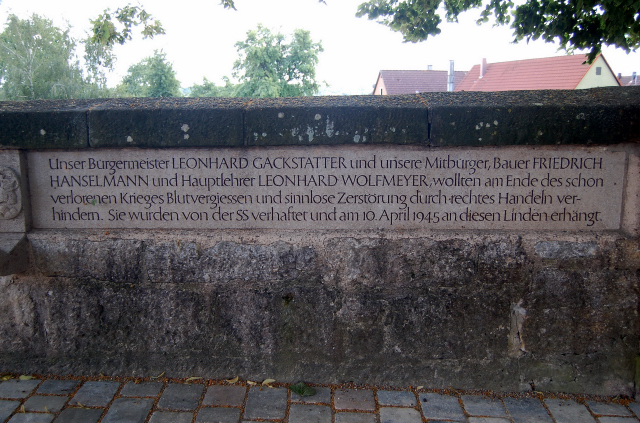
Brettheim memorial

Brettheim is a village in the Schwäbisch Hall district of Baden-Württemberg. Simon ordered the execution of Friedrich Hanselmann, Leonhard Gackstatter and Leonhard Wolfmeyer for Wehrkraftzersetzung ("undermining military morale") on 10 April 1945. The farmer Hanselmann had taken away the weapons of 15-year-old boys from the Hitler Youth and had thrown them into the local pond. The boys reported this to their commanding officer SS-Sturmbannführer Gottschalk, who had Hanselmann arrested. Gottschalk sentenced Hanselmann to death and asked the mayor of Brettheim, Gackstatter, and the teacher Wolfmeyer to confirm the sentence. The two men refused and were subsequently also arrested and sentenced to death. The men were executed by hanging and strung up on a tree at the entrance of the local cemetery. Simon had ordered that the bodies be left hanging for four days. On 17 April 1945 American tanks approached the village. The SS had declared Brettheim a "cornerstone of the German defense" and prevented the hoisting of white flags. The Americans opened fire, and within a short time the village became a burning inferno. 17 civilians were killed.

On 1 May 1945 the Corps surrendered to the American forces.

== War crimes conviction ==
After the war, Max Simon was sentenced to death by a British court for his part in the Marzabotto massacre. This sentence was later changed to life imprisonment. Simon was released from prison in 1954.

Simon was subsequently tried three times by West German courts for the killings in Brettheim and other crimes, but, "to the horror of the West German public," was found not guilty. Simon died in 1961. Even in death, Simon caused some controversy, as HIAG, an organization of former Waffen-SS members, attempted to place a glorifying obituary for him in the German newspaper Frankfurter Allgemeine. To HIAG's indignation, the newspaper refused to run the obituary.

== Promotions ==
- 27 June 1917 Krankenpfleger (Military Nurse)
- 14 August 1919 Gefreiter (Private E-2/Lance Corporal)
- 24 March 1920 Unteroffizier (NCO/Corporal/Junior Sergeant)
- 1 November 1924 Wachtmeister (Staff Sergeant)

=== SS ===
- 16 January 1933 SS-Anwärter (SS Candidate)
- 9 August 1933 SS-Mann
- 1 October 1933 SS-Sturmmann
- 1 November 1933 SS-Scharführer
- 8 November 1933 SS-Oberscharführer
- 10 March 1934 SS-Truppführer
- 20 June 1934 SS-Obertruppführer
- 9 November 1934 SS-Untersturmführer
- 30 January 1935 SS-Obersturmführer
- 16 February 1935 SS-Hauptsturmführer
- 15 September 1935 SS-Sturmbannführer
- 12 September 1937 SS-Obersturmbannführer
- 11 September 1938 SS-Standartenführer
- 1 September 1941 SS-Oberführer
- 1 December 1942 SS-Brigadeführer
- 20 April 1944 SS-Gruppenführer und Generalleutnant der Waffen-SS

== Awards and decorations (excerpt) ==
- Iron Cross (1914), 2nd Class (31 July 1919)
- Silesian Eagle, 2nd and 1st Class
- Honour Cross of the World War 1914/1918 with Swords
- Honour Chevron for the Old Guard
- Degen (SS)
- SS-Ehrenring
- Anschluss Medal
- Sudetenland Medal with the "Prague Castle" clasp on 4 May 1939
- Clasp to the Iron Cross (1939) 2nd Class (13 September 1939)
- Iron Cross (1939), 1st class (2 October 1939)
- Wound Badge (1939) in Black on 8 July 1941
- Eastern Medal on 13 July 1942
- Knight's Cross of the Iron Cross with Oak Leaves
  - Knight's Cross on 20 October 1941 as SS-Oberführer and commander of SS-Totenkopf-Infanterie-Regiment 1
  - Oak Leaves on 28 October 1944 as SS-Gruppenführer and Generalleutnant of the Waffen-SS and commander of the 16th SS Panzergrenadier Division Reichsführer-SS
- Demyansk Shield
- German Cross in Gold on 9 October 1944 as SS-Gruppenführer and Generalleutnant of the Waffen-SS and commander of the 16th SS Panzergrenadier Division Reichsführer-SS
