= Walter Reder =

Austrian SS commander Reder (1915–1991)

- Walter Reder at his trial
- Born: 4 February 1915; Freiwaldau, Austria-Hungary
- Died: 26 April 1991 (aged 76); Vienna, Austria
- Occupations: Regimental commander, Reichsführer-SS Division of the Waffen-SS
- Known for: Vinca massacre Marzabotto massacre
- Status: Deceased
- Conviction: War crimes
- Penalty: Life imprisonment

Walter Reder (4 February 1915 – 26 April 1991) was an Austrian SS commander and war criminal during World War II. He served with the SS Division Totenkopf and the SS Division Reichsführer-SS. He and the unit under his command committed the Vinca massacre and Marzabotto massacre in Italy in 1944. After the war, Reder was convicted of war crimes in Italy.

== Early life ==
Walter Reder was born in Freiwaldau, Austrian Silesia, Austria-Hungary. His family was of conservative orientation. After World War I and the dissolution of Austria-Hungary, the family left Austrian Silesia and settled in Garsten near Steyr, their ancestral home. Reder's father, Rudolf, worked at the Brotfabrik Reders Söhne ("Bread Factory Reder's Sons") in Garsten and founded a calculator factory in 1925. According to press records from the 1920s, the company was not financially stable and went bankrupt in 1928. Subsequently, Reder's father received a prison sentence for fraud.

As a result of the bankruptcy, Reder left his family and settled with an aunt in Vienna. In 1932, he left for Linz and received education at the Handelsakademie Linz. That same year, he joined the Hitler Youth.

== SS career ==
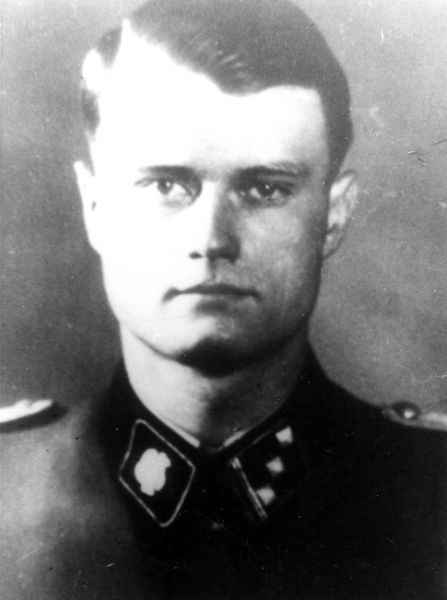
Walter Reder as a SS-Obersturmführer

Reder joined the SS-Verfügungstruppe and was granted German citizenship in December 1934. During World War II, he served in the Waffen-SS. In March 1943 he was wounded and lost his left arm. Upon recovering, he was assigned to the SS Panzergrenadier Training and Replacement Battalion 3. This unit was involved in the suppression of the Warsaw Ghetto Uprising of April–July 1943. In December 1943, Reder was transferred to the newly formed 16th SS Panzergrenadier Division Reichsführer-SS and served in Italy until 1945. In 1943, Reder became the commander of the SS-Panzer-Aufklärungsabteilung 16, which committed several massacres in 1944. In March 1945, his division withdrew to Hungary and later to Austria. Reder was taken into custody by U.S. soldiers, who then handed him over to British forces near Klagenfurt.

== Trial and conviction ==
Reder was extradited to Italy in May 1948 to stand trial for war crimes. He was tried by an Italian military court in Bologna for ordering the destruction of the town of Marzabotto and other villages near Bologna in August and September 1944 during so-called anti-partisan sweeps, and for ordering the execution of 2,700 Italian civilians in Tuscany and Emilia during the same period. In October 1951, he was sentenced to life imprisonment at a fortress prison in Gaeta, on the Tyrrhenian Sea coast between Naples and Rome.

The citizens of Marzabotto and survivors of the massacre voted 237 to 1 against freeing Reder. Local officials had stated that as many as 1,830 civilians died in massacres in and around Marzabotto.

Years later, a group of SS men whom Reder had commanded in 1944 were tried and convicted for their role in the Sant'Anna di Stazzema massacre. Their convictions and sentencing were conducted in absentia. Reder was paroled in January 1985, after which he returned to Austria. He died in 1991.

== Sources ==
- Beschluss des Militärtribunals van Bari (Italien) vom 14. Juli 1980, translation by the court interpreter Dr. Oscar Groschup, commissioned by advocat general Dr. Robert Linke, Ministry of Justice, Austria
- Marzabotto: The Crimes of Walter Reder - SS-Sturmbannführer, by Christian Ortner (Vienna, 1985)
- Barbara Tóth: Der Handschlag. Die Affäre Frischenschlager-Reder. Dissertation an der Universität Wien, Wien 2010 (Volltext [PDF; 1,5 MB], 10. Juni 2010).
