= Sant'Anna di Stazzema massacre =

1944 killings by the Waffen-SS in Italy

- Part of the Italian campaign of World War II
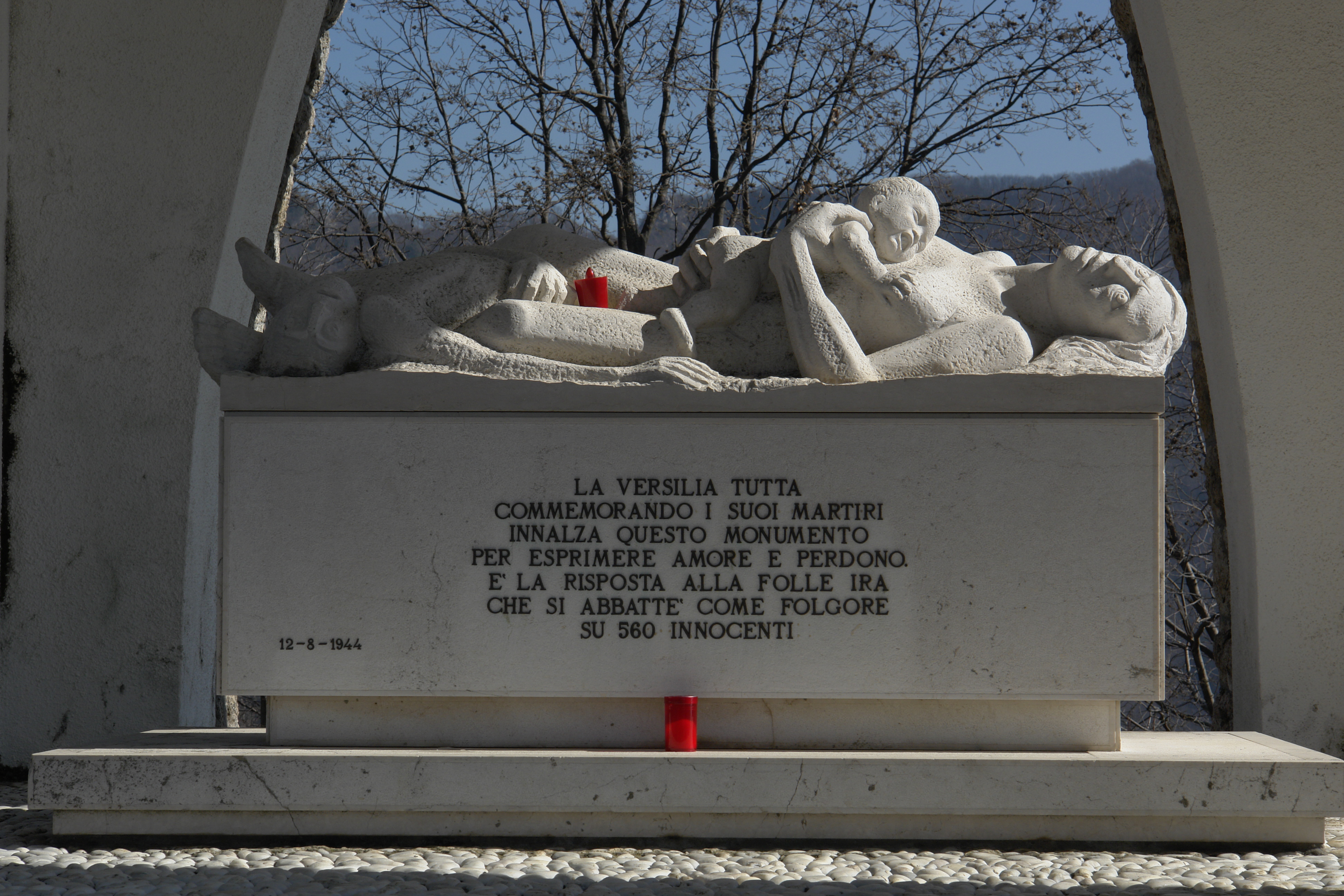
- Massacre memorial sculpture
- Location: 43°58′27″N 10°16′25″E; Sant'Anna di Stazzema, Italy
- Date: 12 August 1944
- Target: Civilian villagers and refugees
- Attack type: War crime, massacre, mass shooting, mass murder, terrorism
- Deaths: ~ 560 (130 were children)
- Perpetrators: 16th SS Panzergrenadier Division Reichsführer-SS, Black Brigades milita

The Sant'Anna di Stazzema massacre was an Axis war crime, which was committed in the hill village of Sant'Anna di Stazzema in Tuscany, Italy, in the course of an operation against the Italian resistance movement during the Italian Campaign of World War II. On 12 August 1944, the Waffen-SS, with the help of the Italian paramilitary Black Brigades, murdered about 560 local villagers and refugees, including more than a hundred children, and burned their bodies. These crimes have been defined as voluntary and organized acts of terrorism by the Military Tribunal of La Spezia and the Supreme Court of Cassation, which is the highest Italian court of appeal.

== Massacre ==
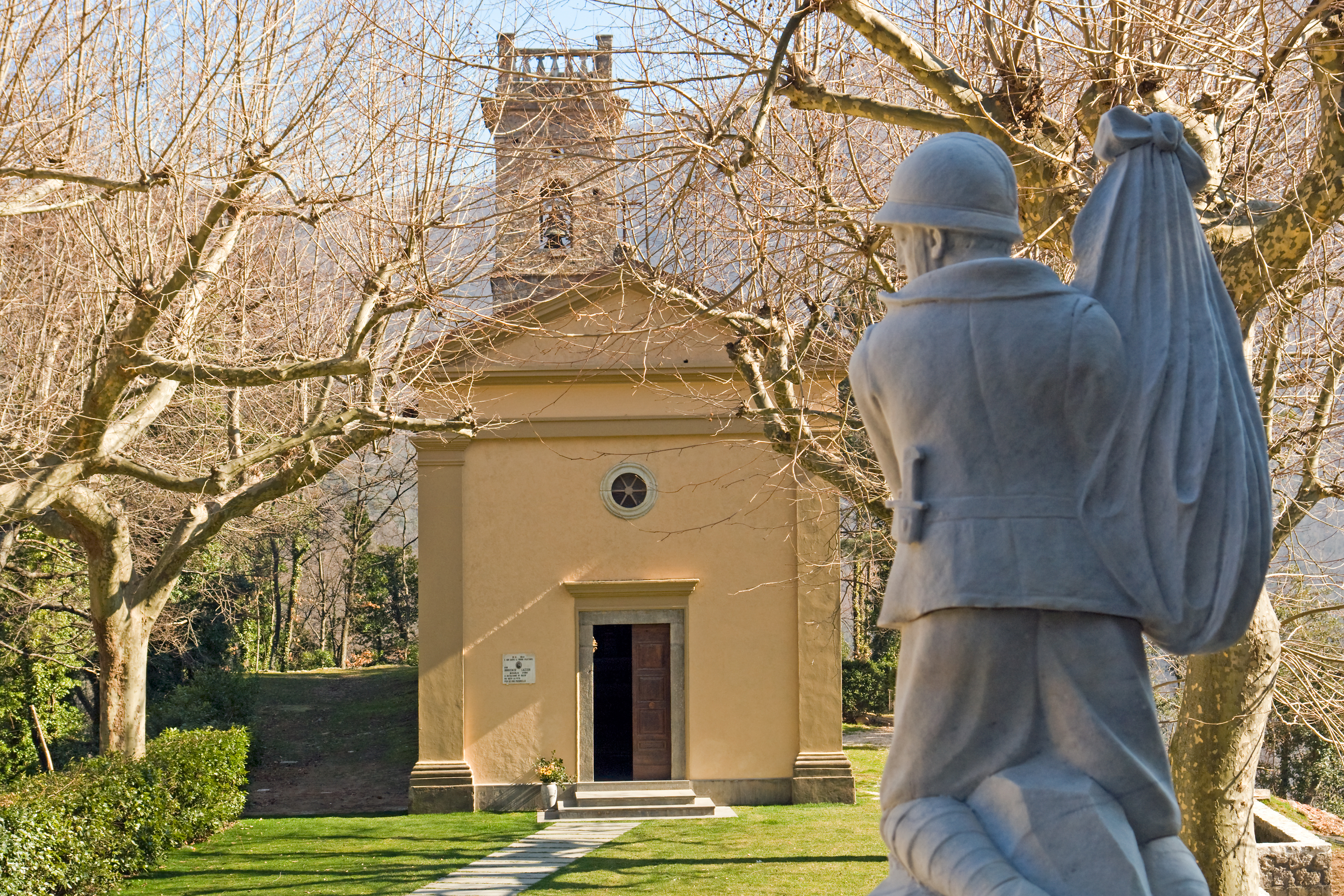
The restored village church and World War I memorial in 2008

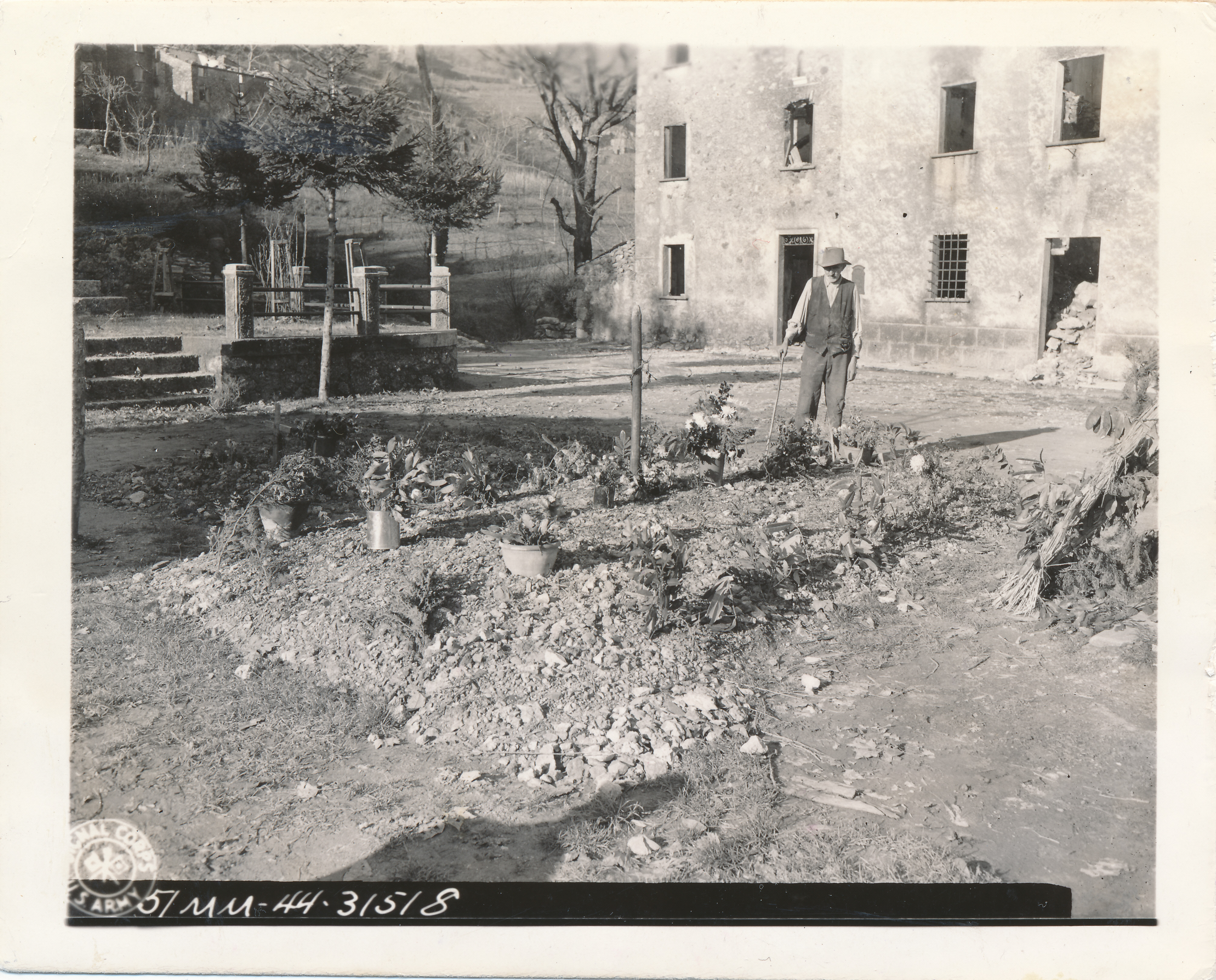
An elderly survivor at the village on 14 December 1944

On the morning of 12 August 1944, German troops of the 2nd Battalion of SS Panzergrenadier Regiment 35 of 16th SS Panzergrenadier Division Reichsführer-SS, commanded by SS-Hauptsturmführer Anton Galler, entered the mountain village of Sant'Anna di Stazzema. With them came fascists from the Black Brigades dressed in German uniforms.

The soldiers immediately proceeded to round up villagers and refugees, locking up hundreds of them in several barns and stables, before systematically executing them. The killings were done mostly by shooting groups of people with machine guns or by herding them into basements and other enclosed spaces and tossing in hand grenades. At the 16th-century local church, the priest Fiore Menguzzo (awarded the Medal for Civil Valor posthumously in 1999) was shot at point-blank range, after which machine guns were then turned on some 100 people gathered there. In all, the victims included at least 107 children (the youngest of whom, Anna Pardini, was only 20 days old), as well as eight pregnant women (one of whom, Evelina Berretti, had her womb cut with a bayonet and her baby pulled out and killed separately).

After other people were killed through the village, their corpses were set on fire (at the church, the soldiers used its pews for a bonfire to dispose of the bodies). The livestock were also exterminated and the whole village was burned down. All this took three hours. The SS men then sat down outside the burning Sant'Anna and ate lunch.

== Aftermath ==
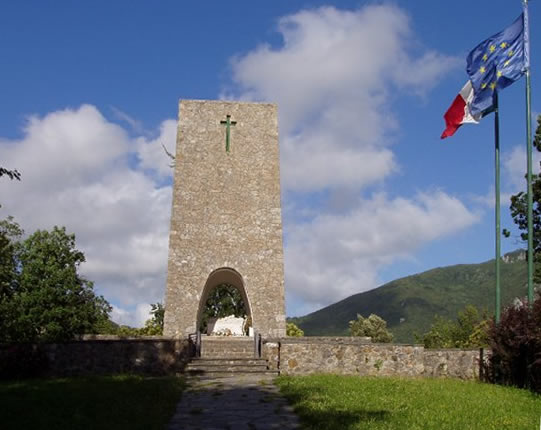
The National Park of Peace monument in 2007

After the war, the church was rebuilt. The Charnel House Monument and the Historical Museum of Resistance were both built nearby. Stations of the Cross illustrate scenes from the massacre along the trail from the church to the main memorial site—the National Park of Peace, founded in 2000. The massacre inspired the novel Miracle at St. Anna by James McBride, and Spike Lee's film of the same title that was based on it.

=== Prosecutions ===
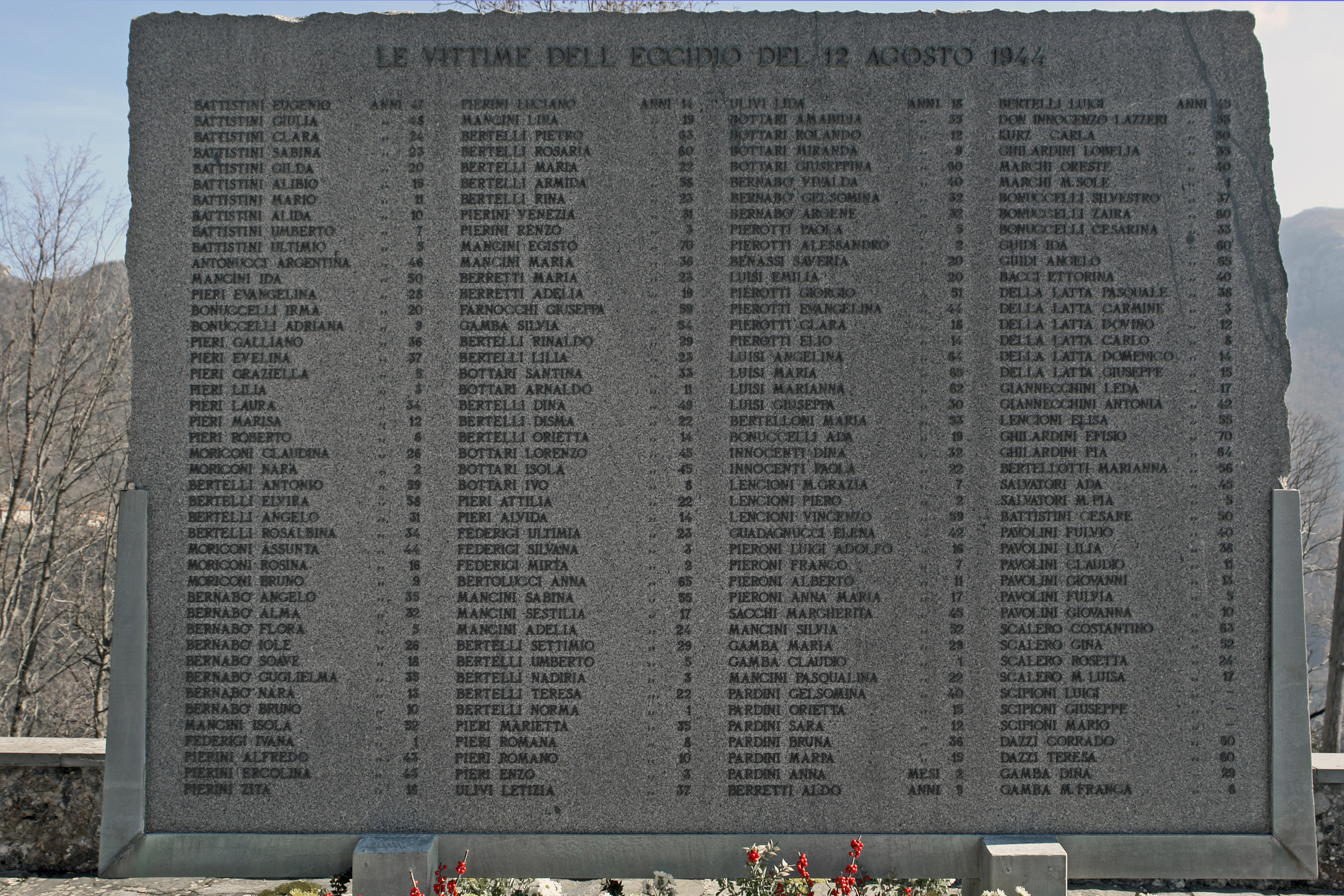
List of the victims

Apart from the divisional commander Max Simon, (Note: Simon was sentenced to death for war crimes. The sentence was later commuted to life in prison. He was pardoned in 1954 and died in 1961.) no one was prosecuted for this massacre until July 2004, when a trial of ten former Waffen-SS officers and NCOs living in Germany was held before a military court in La Spezia, Italy. On 22 June 2005, the court found the accused guilty of participation in the killings and sentenced them in absentia to life imprisonment:

- Werner Bruß (or Bruss) (b. 1920, former SS-Unterscharführer)
- Alfred Mathias Concina (b. 1919, former SS-Unterscharführer)
- Ludwig Göring (or Goring) (b. 1923, former SS-Rottenführer who confessed to killing twenty women),
- Karl Gropler (b. 1923, former SS-Unterscharführer)
- Georg Rauch (b. 1921, former SS-Untersturmführer)
- Horst Richter (b. 1921, former SS-Unterscharführer)
- Heinrich Schendel (b. 1922, former SS-Unterscharführer)
- Alfred Schöneberg (b. 1921, former SS-Unterscharführer)
- Gerhard Sommer, (b. 1921, former SS-Untersturmführer)
- Ludwig Heinrich Sonntag (b. 1924, former SS-Unterscharführer)

Extradition requests from Italy were rejected by Germany. In 2012, German prosecutors shelved their investigation of 17 unnamed former SS soldiers (eight of whom were still alive) who were part of the unit involved in the massacre because of a lack of evidence. The statement said: "Belonging to a Waffen-SS unit that was deployed to Sant'Anna di Stazzema cannot replace the need to prove individual guilt. Rather, for every defendant it must be proven that he took part in the massacre, and in which form." Michele Silicani, the mayor of the village and a survivor who was 10 when the raid occurred, called the verdict "a scandal" and said he would urge Italy's justice minister to lobby Germany to reopen the case. German deputy foreign minister Michael Georg Link commented that "while respecting the independence of the German justice system", it was not possible "to ignore that such a decision causes deep dismay and renewed suffering to Italians, not just survivors and relatives of the victims."

== See also ==
- Collective punishment
- Fragheto Massacre
- List of massacres in Italy
- Marzabotto massacre
- Oradour-sur-Glane massacre
- Sassoleone massacre
