= 16th SS Panzergrenadier Division Reichsführer-SS =

German armored division

- 16. SS-Panzergrenadier-Division "Reichsführer SS"
- Unit insignia
- Active: 1943–1945
- Country: Nazi Germany
- Branch: (Schutzstaffel) Waffen-SS
- Type: Panzergrenadier
- Size: Division
- Patron: Heinrich Himmler, Karl Hanke

The 16th SS Panzergrenadier Division "Reichsführer-SS" (German: 16. SS-Panzergrenadier-Division "Reichsführer SS") was a motorised infantry formation in the Waffen-SS of Nazi Germany during World War II.

The division, during its time in Italy, committed a number of war crimes, and, together with the 1st Fallschirm-Panzer Division Hermann Göring, was disproportionally involved in massacres of the civilian population. One possible reason for the division's increased involvement in war crimes has been identified by the fact that much of its leadership originally came from the SS-Totenkopfverbände.

== History ==
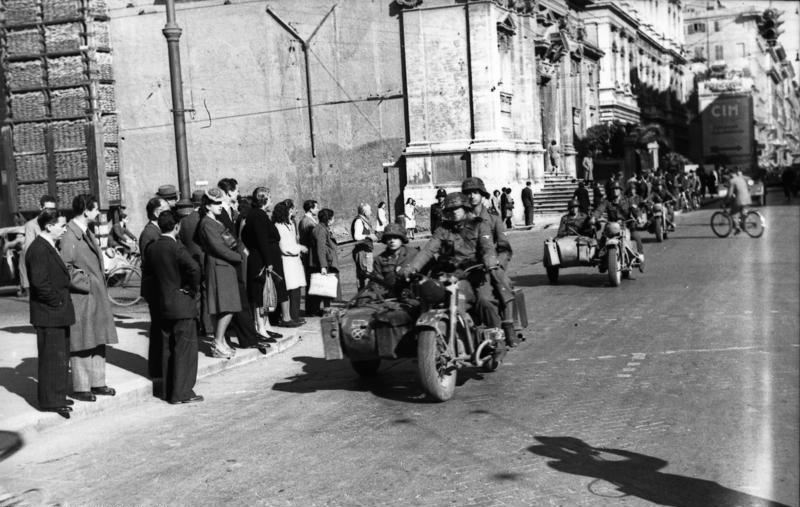
A motorcycle unit of the division in Rome, November 1943

Formed in November 1943 with the Sturmbrigade Reichsführer SS was used as the cadre in the formation of the new division. A Kampfgruppe ("battle group") from the division fought at the Anzio beachhead, while the rest of the division took part in the occupation of Hungary. It fought in Italy as a division from May 1944, until being transferred to Hungary in February 1945.

On 27 June 1944 the 16th SS-Panzergrenadiers command post in San Vincenzo, Italy was overrun by the U.S. 1st Battalion, 133rd Infantry, 34th Infantry Division (Red Bulls). The command post was a town centre apartment which had been commandeered; when the owners returned to their apartment they found a signed large leather-bound Stielers Handatlas which had been left behind.

In late summer 1944, a part of this division, SS-Panzer-Aufklärungsabteilung 16 (Reconnaissance Battalion 16), commanded by Major Walter Reder, was withdrawn from engagement with the American 5th Army then advancing on the Gothic Line to deal with an Italian Communist partisan unit, the Red Star Brigade (Brigata Stella Rossa). Operating out of a mountain complex centered on Monte Sole, just southeast of the town of Marzabotto, and sitting astride communications to Bologna, the Red Star was seen as a significant threat to the German rear, both in terms of cutting communications and obstructing a possible route of retreat. Major Reder completed his assignment and destroyed this guerrilla force.

A Kampfgruppe of the 16th Training and Replacement Battalion was based in Arnhem and took part in Operation Market Garden. The division surrendered to British forces near Klagenfurt, Austria, at the end of the war.

== War crimes ==
The division was involved in many war crimes while stationed in Italy during World War II. Together with the 1st Fallschirm-Panzer Division Hermann Göring the 16th SS Panzergrenadier is estimated to be responsible for about one third of all civilians killed in massacres in Italy during the war. In regards to these war crimes the 16th SS Panzer Reconnaissance Battalion and its commander, Walter Reder, have been identified as one of the main culprits. The division is estimated to have killed up to 2,000 Italian civilians during its time there.

In August 1944 alone, in the Versilia and Lunigiana areas of Tuscany, there were three large massacres. 560 civilians were massacred at Sant'Anna di Stazzema on 12 August 1944, 159 civilians executed at San Terenzo Monti on 17 August and 173 civilians murdered at Vinca starting on 24 August. The division was also responsible for the Marzabotto massacre, where at least 770 Italian civilians were executed, the worst massacre committed by the German Army on Italian civilians during World War II.

Major Walter Reder, the SS commander who signed the order to execute the civilians at San Terenzo, was extradited to Italy in 1948 and tried in Bologna in 1951 for war crimes in Tuscany and at Marzabotto in Emilia-Romagna, where 770 people were massacred, making it the worst massacre of civilians committed by the Waffen-SS in Western Europe during the war. He was found guilty and sentenced to life in prison. However, he was released in 1985, and he returned unrepentant to his native Austria, where he was received with full military honors. He died in 1991.

In a case filed decades late due to misplaced evidence, ten SS officers of the 16th SS Panzergrenadier Division were convicted of murder in absentia in 2005 at La Spezia for the slaughter at Sant'Anna di Stazzema. German prosecutors declined to proceed on the grounds that there was a lack of evidence tying specific murders to specific defendants.

== Commanders ==
- SS-Obersturmbannführer Karl Gesele (February 1942 – September 1943)
- SS-Gruppenführer Max Simon (3 October 1943 – 24 October 1944)
- SS-Oberführer Otto Baum (24 October 1944 – 8 May 1945)

== See also ==
- List of Waffen-SS units
