= Marzabotto massacre =

World War II war crime

Coordinates: 44°18′37″N 11°13′11″E

- Part of the Italian campaign of World War II
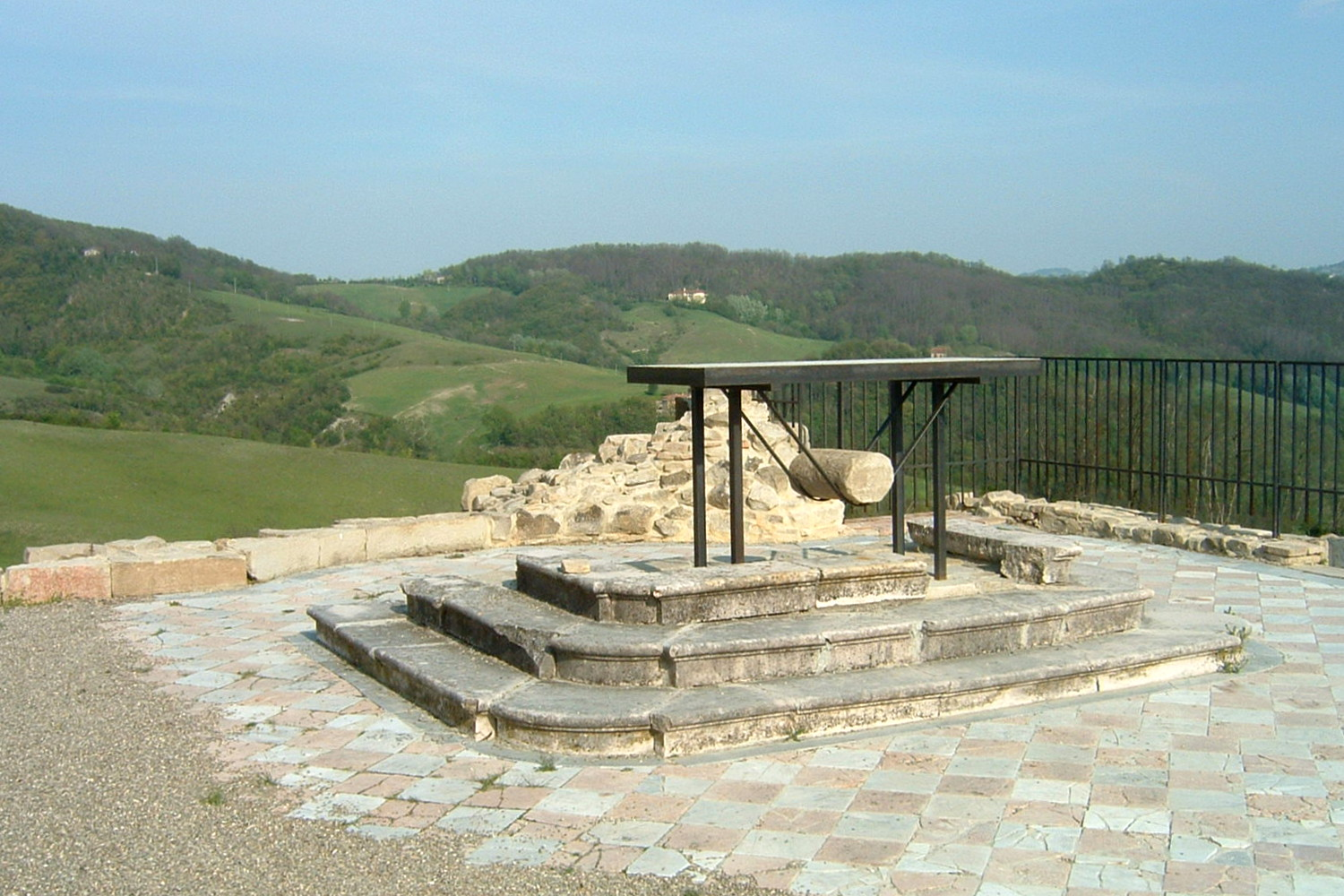
- Remains of the church of San Martino di Monte Sole
- Location: Marzabotto, Italy
- Date: 29 September – 5 October 1944
- Target: Italian civilians
- Attack type: Massacre, mass shooting, mass murder, war crime
- Deaths: 1,830
- Perpetrator: 16th SS Panzergrenadier Division Reichsführer-SS

The Marzabotto massacre (Italian: strage di Marzabotto, lit. 'Marzabotto slaughter'), or more correctly, the massacre of Monte Sole, was a World War II war crime consisting of the mass murder of 770 civilians by Waffen-SS, which took place in the territory around the small village of Marzabotto, in the mountainous area south of Bologna. It was the largest massacre of civilians committed by the Waffen-SS in western Europe during the war. It is also the deadliest mass shooting in the history of Italy.

== Massacre ==
In reprisal for attacks on German soldiers by partisans and the Resistance between 29 September and 5 October 1944, SS-Sturmbannführer Walter Reder led soldiers of the 16th SS Panzergrenadier Division Reichsführer-SS to systematically kill hundreds of people in Marzabotto. They also killed numerous residents of the adjacent Grizzana Morandi and Monzuno communes, the area of the massif of Monte Sole (part of the Apennine range in the province of Bologna).

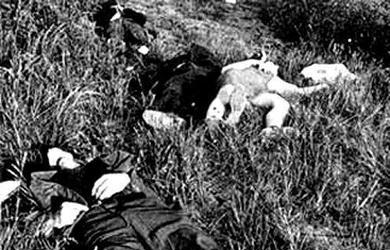
Unknown victims

Historians have struggled to document the number of victims. Some sources report up to 1,830 victims; others estimate 955 people killed. The Peace School Foundation of Monte Sole reports 770 victims. This number is close to the official report by Sturmbannführer Reder, who reported the "execution of 728 bandits". Among the victims, 155 were less than 10 years old, 95 were aged 10 to 16, 142 were over 60 years old, 454 were male and 316 were female. Five were priests.

Giovanni Fornasini, a parish priest and member of the Resistance, risked his life to protect the population from the Nazis during the massacres. While Fornasini saved the lives of many of his parishioners and managed to escape immediate death, he was later discovered by an SS officer while he was burying the bodies of those killed in the massacre, which was forbidden by the Nazis. The officer accused him of crimes committed in the Marzabotto area. When Fornasini confessed to having helped the villagers avoid execution, the officer shot and killed him.

== Justice ==
- The British tried SS General Max Simon for his part in the massacre. He was sentenced to death, later changed to life in prison. Simon was released in 1954 and died in 1961.
- The Americans arrested SS Major Walter Reder, an Austrian national, in Salzburg, and handed him over to the British. Reder was extradited to Italy in May 1948 to stand trial for war crimes. In 1951 he was tried in an Italian military court in Bologna. He was sentenced to life imprisonment in the military prison at Gaeta. He was released in 1985 and died six years later in 1991.
- In 1998, on the 54th anniversary of the massacre, the German President Johannes Rau made a formal apology to Italy and expressed his "profound sorrow and shame" to the families of the victims of Marzabotto.
- In January 2007, 10 of 17 suspected former SS members were found guilty in absentia by an Italian military tribunal in the north Italian town of La Spezia. They were sentenced to life imprisonment for the massacre. The Italian media reported that the 10 were also ordered to pay roughly €100 million to the survivors and relatives of the victims. Seven suspects were acquitted.

== Victims ==
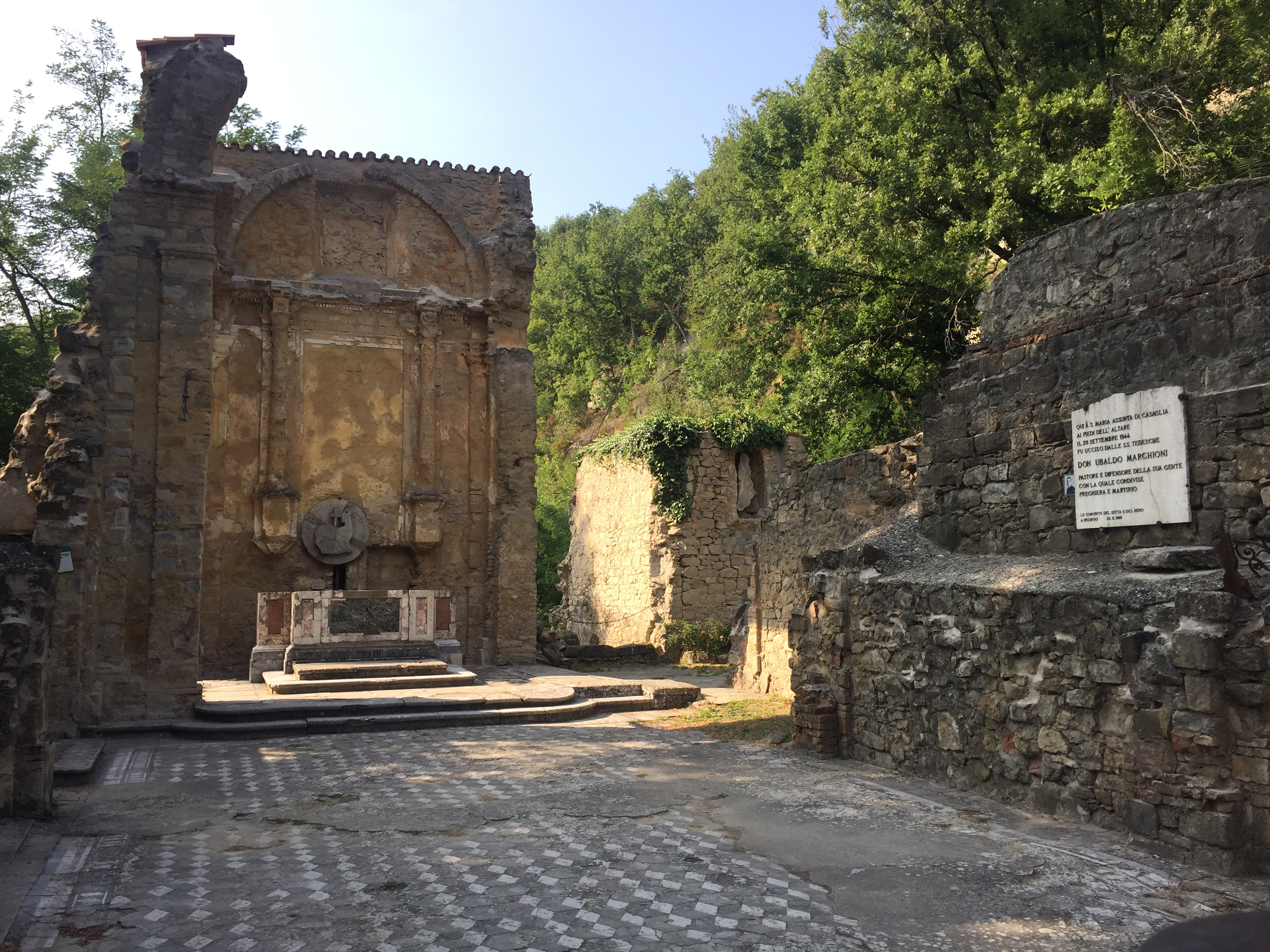
Church of S.Maria Assunta di Casaglia and memorial to Don Ubaldo Marchioni

- Giovanni Fornasini (1915–1944), priest, Gold Medal of Military Valour, Servo di Dio
- Ubaldo Marchioni (1918–1944), priest

== In popular culture ==
- The 1975 film Salò, or the 120 Days of Sodom, which deals with philosophical themes about fascism, consumerism and the abuse of power, features a scene where hostages in a fascist convoy drives through Marzabotto as one hostage tries to escape. The scene was not shot in the real Marzabotto location.
- The Man Who Will Come (2009) tells the story of the local Italian people, partisans and the Marzabotto massacre. It has won numerous awards. It features Raffaele Zabban playing Don Giovanni Fornasini, and Germano Maccioni playing Don Ubaldo Marchioni.

== See also ==
- Sant'Anna di Stazzema massacre
- Lidice
- Kľak
- Oradour-sur-Glane massacre
- Ochota massacre
- Khatyn massacre
- Italian Campaign (World War II)
- List of massacres in Italy
- German war crimes

== Sources ==
- Marzabotto: The Crimes of Walter Reder - SS-Sturmbannführer, by Christian Ortner (Vienna, 1985)
- Silence on Monte Sole, by Jack Olsen (New York City, 1968) ISBN 0-213-17794-3
- Don Giovanni Fornasini, Associazione Nazionale Partigiani d'Italia
