= The Holocaust in Italy =

- The Italian Social Republic

Overview
- Period: September 1943 – May 1945
- Territory: Italian Social Republic

Major perpetrators
- Units: SS-Totenkopfverbände Einsatzgruppen Fascist Italian Police

Victims
- Killed: 7,680
- Pre-war population: 44,500

The Holocaust saw the persecution, deportation, and murder of Jews between 1943 and 1945 in the Italian Social Republic, a puppet state of Nazi Germany after the Italian surrender on 8 September 1943, during World War II.

One of the first actions that the Italian government took against Italian Jews began in 1938 with the enactment of the Racial Laws of segregation by the fascist regime of Benito Mussolini. These laws stripped away many basic human rights of the Italian Jewish citizens, with Jewish children not being allowed to go to school and Jews forbidden from marrying outside their cultural heritage. Before the Italian surrender in 1943, however, Italy and the Italian occupation zones in Greece, France and Yugoslavia had comparatively been places of relative safety for local Jews and European Jewish refugees. This changed in September 1943, when German forces occupied the country, installed the puppet state of the Italian Social Republic and immediately began persecuting and deporting the Jews found there. Of the population of 38,994 Italian Jews, 7,172 were arrested and became victims of the Holocaust. By the war's end, 31,822 Jews remained in the country, having managed to evade deportation while remaining in Italy. The Italian police and Fascist militia played an integral role as the Germans' accessories.

While most Italian concentration camps were police and transit camps, one camp, the Risiera di San Sabba in Trieste, was also an extermination camp. It is estimated that up to 5,000 political prisoners were murdered there. More than 10,000 political prisoners and 40,000–50,000 captured Italian soldiers were interned and killed overall.

== Situation prior to 8 September 1943 ==
At the beginning of the twentieth century, Jews were a well-integrated minority in Italy. They had lived in the country for over two thousand years. After Benito Mussolini seized power in October 1922 (March on Rome), Jews in Fascist Italy initially suffered far less persecution, if any at all, compared to the Jews in Nazi Germany in the lead up to World War II (aside from the repression used to enforce Fascist rule in general). Some Fascist leaders, such as Achille Starace and Roberto Farinacci, were indeed antisemites, but others, such as Italo Balbo, were not, and until 1938 antisemitism was not the official policy of the party. Like the rest of Italians, Jews were divided between fascists and anti-fascists. Some were sympathetic to the regime, joined the party and occupied significant offices and positions in politics and economy (Aldo Finzi, Renzo Ravenna, Margherita Sarfatti, Ettore Ovazza, Guido Jung). Others were active in anti-fascist organizations (Carlo Rosselli, Nello Rosselli, Leone Ginzburg, Umberto Terracini).

In 1938, under the Italian Racial Laws, Italian Jews lost their civil rights, including those to property, education and employment. They were removed from government jobs, the armed forces, and public schools (both as teachers and students). To escape persecution, around 6,000 Italian Jews emigrated to other countries in 1938–39. Among them were intellectuals such as Emilio Segrè, Bruno Rossi, Mario Castelnuovo-Tedesco, Franco Modigliani, Arnaldo Momigliano, Ugo Fano, Robert Fano, and many others. Enrico Fermi also moved to the United States, as his wife was Jewish.

In September 1939, World War II began. In June 1940, when the Wehrmacht won the Battle of France, the Fascist Italian government opened around 50 concentration camps. These were used predominantly to hold political prisoners but also around 2,200 Jews of foreign nationality (Italian Jews were not interned). The Jews in these camps were not treated differently than political prisoners. While living conditions and food were often basic, prisoners were not subject to violent treatment. The Mussolini regime even allowed a Jewish-Italian organization (DELASEM) to operate legally in support of the Jewish internees.

Conditions for non-Jews were much worse. Italian authorities perceived that imprisoned Roma were used to a harsh life, and they received much lower food allowances and more basic accommodation. After the Wehrmacht had occupated Yugoslavia and Greece in April 1941, Italy opened concentration camps in its occupation zones there. These held a total of up to 150,000 people, mostly Slavs. Living conditions were very harsh, and the mortality rates in these camps far exceeded those of the camps in Italy.

Unlike Jews in other Axis-aligned countries, no Jews in Italy or Italian-occupied areas were murdered or deported to concentration camps or extermination camps within the sphere of influence of Nazi Germany before September 1943. In the territories occupied by the Italian Army in Greece, France and Yugoslavia, Jews even found protection from persecution. The Italian Army actively protected Jews in occupation zones, to the frustration of Nazi Germany, and to the point where the Italian sector in Croatia was referred to as the "Promised Land". Up to September 1943, Germany made no serious attempt to force Mussolini and Fascist Italy into handing over Italian Jews. It was nevertheless irritated with the Italian refusal to arrest and deport its Jewish population, feeling it encouraged other countries allied with the Axis powers to refuse as well.

On 25 July 1943, with the fall of the Fascist Regime and the arrest of Benito Mussolini, the situation in the Italian concentration camps changed. Inmates, including Jewish prisoners, were gradually released. However, this process was not completed by the time German authorities took over the camps in northern-central Italy on 8 September 1943. Hundreds of Jewish refugees who were imprisoned in the major camps in the South (Campagna internment camp and Ferramonti di Tarsia) were liberated by the Western Allies. Wehrmacht troops began Operation Achse: they forcibly disarmed the Italian armed forces and occupied large parts of Italy. On 12 September 1943, a German commando freed Mussolini, who was in custody in the Gran Sasso massif.

43,000 Jews (35,000 Italians and 8,000 refugees from other countries) were trapped in the territories now under control of the Italian Social Republic.

In general, the fate and persecution of Jews in Italy between 1938 and 1943 has received only little attention in the Italian media. Lists of Jews drawn up to enforce the racial laws would be used to round them up after the Italian surrender on 8 September 1943.

== The Holocaust in Italy ==
Key locations of the Holocaust in Italy

The murdering of Jews in Italy began on 8 September 1943, after German troops seized control of Northern and Central Italy, freed Benito Mussolini from prison and installed him as the head of the puppet state of the Italian Social Republic.

=== Organisation ===
SS-Obergruppenführer Karl Wolff was appointed as the Supreme SS and Police Leader in Italy. He was tasked with overseeing SS operations and, thereby, the 'final solution', a euphemism for the genocide of the Jews. Wolff assembled a group of SS personnel under him with vast experience in the extermination of Jews in Eastern Europe. Odilo Globocnik, appointed as Higher SS and Police Leader for the Adriatic coastal area, was responsible for the murder of hundreds of thousands of Jews and Gypsies in Lublin, Poland, before being sent to Italy. Karl Brunner was appointed as SS and Police Leader in Bolzano, South Tyrol, Willy Tensfeld in Monza for upper and western Italy and Karl-Heinz Bürger was placed in charge of anti-partisan operations.

The security police and the Sicherheitsdienst (SD) came under the command of Wilhelm Harster, based in Verona. He had held the same position in the Netherlands. Theodor Dannecker, previously active in the deportation of Greek Jews in the part of Greece occupied by Bulgaria, was made chief of the Judenreferat of the SD and was tasked with the deportation of the Italian Jews. Not seen as efficient enough, he was replaced by Friedrich Boßhammer, who like Dannecker, was closely associated with Adolf Eichmann.

Martin Sandberger was appointed as the head of the Gestapo in Verona and played a vital role in the arrest and deportation of the Italian Jews.

As in other German-occupied areas, and in the Reich Security Main Office itself, the persecution of the Nazis' undesirable minorities and political opponents fell under Section IV of the Security Police and SD. In turn, Section IV was subdivided into further departments, of which department IV–4b was responsible for Jewish affairs. Dannecker, then Boßhammer headed this department.

=== The Congress of Verona ===
The attitude of the Italian Fascists towards Italian Jews changed drastically in November 1943, after the Fascist authorities declared them to be of "enemy nationality" during the Congress of Verona and began to participate actively in the prosecution and arrest of Jews. Initially, after the Italian surrender, the Italian police had only assisted in the round-up of Jews when requested to do so by German authorities. With the Manifest of Verona, in which Jews were declared foreigners, and in times of war enemies, this changed. Police Order No. 5 on 30 November 1943, issued by Guido Buffarini Guidi, minister of the interior of the RSI, ordered the Italian police to arrest Jews and confiscate their property. This order, however, exempted Jews over the age of 70 or of mixed marriages, which frustrated the Germans who wanted to arrest and deport all Italian Jews.

=== Deportation and murder ===
The arrest and deportation of Jews in German-occupied Italy can be separated into two distinct phases. The first, under Dannecker, from September 1943 to January 1944, saw mobile Einsatzkommandos target Jews in major Italian cities. The second phase took place under Boßhammer, who had replaced Dannecker in early 1944. Boßhammer set up a centralised persecution system, using all available German and Fascist Italian police resources, to arrest and deport Italian Jews.

The arrest of Jewish Italians and Jewish refugees began shortly after the surrender. In September 1943, the Germans demanded that the Jewish community of Rome pay a ransom of 110 pounds of gold in exchange for its safety. Although the ransom was paid, the Germans planned to deport the Jews of Rome regardless. Deportations of Italian Jews began in October 1943. This took place in all major Italian cities under German control, albeit with limited success. The Italian police offered little cooperation, and ninety per cent of Rome's 10,000 Jews escaped arrest. Arrested Jews were taken to the transit camps at Borgo San Dalmazzo, Fossoli and Bolzano, and from there to Auschwitz. Of the 4,800 deported from the camps by the end of 1943 only 314 survived.

Approximately half of all Jews arrested during the Holocaust in Italy were arrested in 1944 by the Italian police.

Altogether, by the end of the war, almost 8,600 Jews from Italy and Italian-controlled areas in France and Greece were deported to Auschwitz; all but 1,000 were murdered. Only 506 were sent to other camps (Bergen-Belsen, Buchenwald, Ravensbrück, and Flossenbürg) as hostages or political prisoners. Among them were a few hundred Jews from Libya, an Italian colony before the war, who had been deported to mainland Italy in 1942, and were sent to Bergen-Belsen concentration camp. Most of them held British and French citizenship and most survived the war.

A further 300 Jews were shot or died of other causes in transit camps in Italy. Of those executed in Italy, almost half were murdered at the Ardeatine massacre in March 1944 alone. The 1st SS Panzer Division Leibstandarte SS Adolf Hitler murdered over 50 Jewish civilians, refugees and Italian nationals, at the Lake Maggiore massacres—the first massacres of Jews by Germany in Italy during the war. These were committed immediately after the Italian surrender, and the bodies sunk in the lake. This occurred despite strict orders at the time not to commit any violence against the civilian population.

In the nineteen months of German occupation, from September 1943 to May 1945, twenty per cent of Italy's pre-war Jewish population was murdered by the Nazis. The actual Jewish population in Italy during the war was, however, higher than the initial 40,000 as the Italian government had evacuated 4,000 Jewish refugees from its occupation zones to southern Italy alone. By September 1943, 43,000 Jews were present in northern Italy and, by the end of the war, 40,000 Jews in Italy had survived the Holocaust.

=== Romani people ===
Unlike Italian Jews, the Romani people faced discrimination by Fascist Italy almost from the start of the regime. In 1926 it ordered that all "foreign Gypsies" should be expelled from the country and, from September 1940, Romani people of Italian nationality were held in designated camps. With the start of the German occupation, many of these camps came under German control. The impact the German occupation had on the Romani people in Italy has seen little research. The number of Romani who were murdered in Italian camps or were deported to concentration camps is uncertain. The number of Romani people who were killed from hunger and exposure during the Fascist Italian period is also unknown but is estimated to be in the thousands.

While Italy observes 27 January as Remembrance Day for the Holocaust and its Jewish Italian victims, efforts to extend this official recognition to the Italian Romani people murdered by the Fascist regime, or deported to extermination camps, have been rejected.

=== Role of the Catholic Church and the Vatican ===
Before the Raid of the Ghetto of Rome Germany had been warned that such an action could raise the displeasure of Pope Pius XII, but the pope never spoke out against the deportation of the Jews of Rome during the war, something that has since sparked controversy. At the same time, members of the Catholic Church provided assistance to Jews and helped them survive the Holocaust in Italy.

== Camps ==
German and Italian-run transit camps for Jews, political prisoners and forced labour existed in Italy. These included:

- Bolzano Transit Camp, in the Trentino-Alto Adige/Südtirol region, then part of the Operational Zone of the Alpine Foothills, operating as a German-controlled transit camp from summer 1944 to May 1945.
- Borgo San Dalmazzo concentration camp, in the Piedmont region, operating as a German-controlled transit camp from September 1943 to November 1943 and, under Italian control, from December 1943 to February 1944.
- Fossoli di Carpi, in the Emilia-Romagna region, operating as a prisoner of war camp under Italian control from May 1942 to September 1943, then as a transit camp, still under Italian control until March 1944 and, from then until November 1944 under German control.

Apart from these transit camps, Germany also operated the Risiera di San Sabba camp in Trieste, then part of the Operational Zone of the Adriatic Littoral, which simultaneously functioned as an extermination and transit camp. It was the only extermination camp in Italy during World War II. It operated from October 1943 to April 1945, with up to 5,000 people murdered there, most of those being political prisoners.

In addition to the designated camps, Jews and political prisoners were held in common prisons, such as the San Vittore Prison in Milan, which gained notoriety during the war through the inhumane treatment of inmates by the SS guards and the torture carried out there. From San Vittore Prison, which served as a transit station for Jews arrested in northern Italy, prisoners were taken to the Milano Centrale railway station. There they were loaded onto freight cars on a secret track underneath the station and deported.

== Looting of Jewish property ==
Apart from the extermination of the Jews, Nazi Germany was also extremely interested in appropriating Jewish property. A 2010 estimate set the value of Jewish property looted in Italy during the Holocaust between 1943 and 1945 at US$1 billion.

In November 1943 the RSI Council of Ministers got together to put in place a new law allowing for Jewish property to be taken. Among the most priceless artefacts lost this way are the contents of the Biblioteca della Comunità Israelitica and the Collegio Rabbinico Italiano, the two Jewish libraries in Rome. Of the former, all of its contents remain missing, while some of the latter's contents were returned after the war.

In 1939 the Italian government established the Agency for the Management and Liquidation of Jewish Property into effect. When the war came to an end, over 17,000 assets that were once the property of Jewish people had been taken from them.

Weeks before the Raid on the Roman Ghetto, Herbert Kappler forced Rome's Jewish community to hand over 50 kilograms (110 lb) of gold in exchange for safety. Despite doing so on 28 September 1943, over 1,000 of its members were arrested on 16 October and deported to Auschwitz where all but 16 were murdered.

== Perpetrators ==
Very few German or Italian perpetrators of the Holocaust in Italy were tried or jailed after the war.

=== Post-war trials ===
Of the war crimes committed by the Nazis in Italy the Ardeatine massacre saw arguably the most perpetrators convicted. High-ranking Wehrmacht officials Albert Kesselring, field marshal and commander of all Axis forces in the Mediterranean theatre, Eberhard von Mackensen, commander of the 14th German Army and Kurt Mälzer, military commander of Rome, were all sentenced to death. They were pardoned and released in 1952; Mälzer died before he could be released. Of the perpetrators from the SS, the police chief of Rome Herbert Kappler was sentenced in 1948 but later escaped jail to Germany. Erich Priebke and Karl Hass were eventually tried in 1997.

Heinrich Andergassen, a Gestapo officer who played a key role in the rounding up and deportations of 25 Jews from Merano, 24 of whom later died, was never tried for his role in their deaths. However, he and three others were arrested by the U.S. Army for the murders of five American and two British POWs. Andergassen and two of his codefendants were executed for those murders on 26 July 1946.

Theodor Dannecker, in charge of the Judenreferat in Italy, committed suicide after being captured in December 1945, thereby avoiding a possible trial. His successor, Friedrich Boßhammer, disappeared at the end of the war in 1945 and subsequently worked as a lawyer in Wuppertal. He was arrested in West Germany in 1968 and eventually sentenced to life in prison for his involvement in the deportation of 3,300 Jews from Italy to Auschwitz. During the Holocaust almost 8,000 of the 45,000 Jews living in Italy perished. During his trial over 200 witnesses were heard before he was sentenced in April 1972. He died a few months after the verdict without having spent any time in prison.

Karl Friedrich Titho's role as camp commander at the Fossoli di Carpi Transit Camp and the Bolzano Transit Camp in the deportation of Jewish camp inmates to Auschwitz was investigated by the state prosecutor in Dortmund, Germany, in the early 1970s. The investigation was eventually terminated because it could not be proven that Titho knew the Jews deported to Auschwitz would be murdered there and that, given the late state of the war, they were murdered at all. He was also tried for the execution of 67 prisoners as reprisal for a partisan attack. It was ruled that this did not classify as being murder but, at most, as manslaughter. As such the charge had exceeded the statute of limitations. The two heads of the department investigating Titho had been members of the Nazi Party from an early date.

In 1964, six members of the Leibstandarte division were charged with the Lago Maggiore massacre, carried out near Meina, as the statute of limitation laws in Germany at the time, twenty years for murder, meant the perpetrators could soon no longer be prosecuted. All the accused were found guilty, and three received life sentences for murder. Two others received a jail sentence of three years for having been accessories to the murders, while the sixth one died during the trial. The sentences were appealed and Germany's highest court, the Bundesgerichtshof, while not overturning the guilty verdict, ruled that the perpetrators had to be freed on a technicality. As the crimes had been committed in 1943 and were investigated by the division at that time without a conclusion, the usual start date for the statute of limitations for Nazi crimes, the date of the German surrender in 1945, did not apply. Since the defendants were charged more than twenty years after the 1943 massacre, the statute of limitations had expired.

This verdict caused much frustration for a younger generation of German state prosecutors who were interested in prosecuting Nazi crimes and their perpetrators. The ruling by the Bundesgerichtshof had further repercussions. It stated perpetrators could only be charged with murder if direct involvement in killing could be proven. In any other cases the charge could only be manslaughter. This meant that after 1960, under German law, the statute of limitations for manslaughter crimes had expired.

In 1969, Germany revoked the statute of limitations for murder altogether, allowing direct murder charges to be prosecuted indefinitely. This was not always applied to Nazi war crimes which were judged by pre-1969 laws. Some like Wolfgang Lehnigk-Emden escaped a jail sentence despite having been found guilty in the case of the Caiazzo massacre.

=== Italian role in the Holocaust ===
The role of Italians as collaborators of the Germans in the Holocaust in Italy has rarely been reflected upon in the country after World War II. A 2015 book by Simon Levis Sullam, a professor of modern history at the Ca' Foscari University of Venice, titled The Italian Executioners: The Genocide of the Jews of Italy examined the role of Italians in the genocide and found half of the Italian Jews murdered in the Holocaust were arrested by Italians and not Germans. Many of these arrests could only be carried out because of tip-offs by civilians. Sullam argued that Italy ignored what he called its "era of the executioner", rehabilitated Italian participants in the Holocaust through a 1946 amnesty, and continued to focus on its role as saviours of the Jews rather than to reflect on the persecution Jews suffered in Fascist Italy.

Michele Sarfatti, one of the most important historians of Italian Jewry in the country, stated that, in his view, up until the 1970s Italians generally believed their country was not involved in the Holocaust, and that it was exclusively the work of the German occupiers instead. This only began to change in the 1990s after the publication of Il Libro Della Memoria by Jewish-Italian historian Liliana Picciotto, and the Italian Racial Laws in book form in the early 2000s. These laws highlighted the fact that Italy's anti-Semitic laws were distinctly independent from those in Nazi Germany and, in some instances, more severe than the early anti-Semitic laws Germany had enacted.

== Commemoration ==
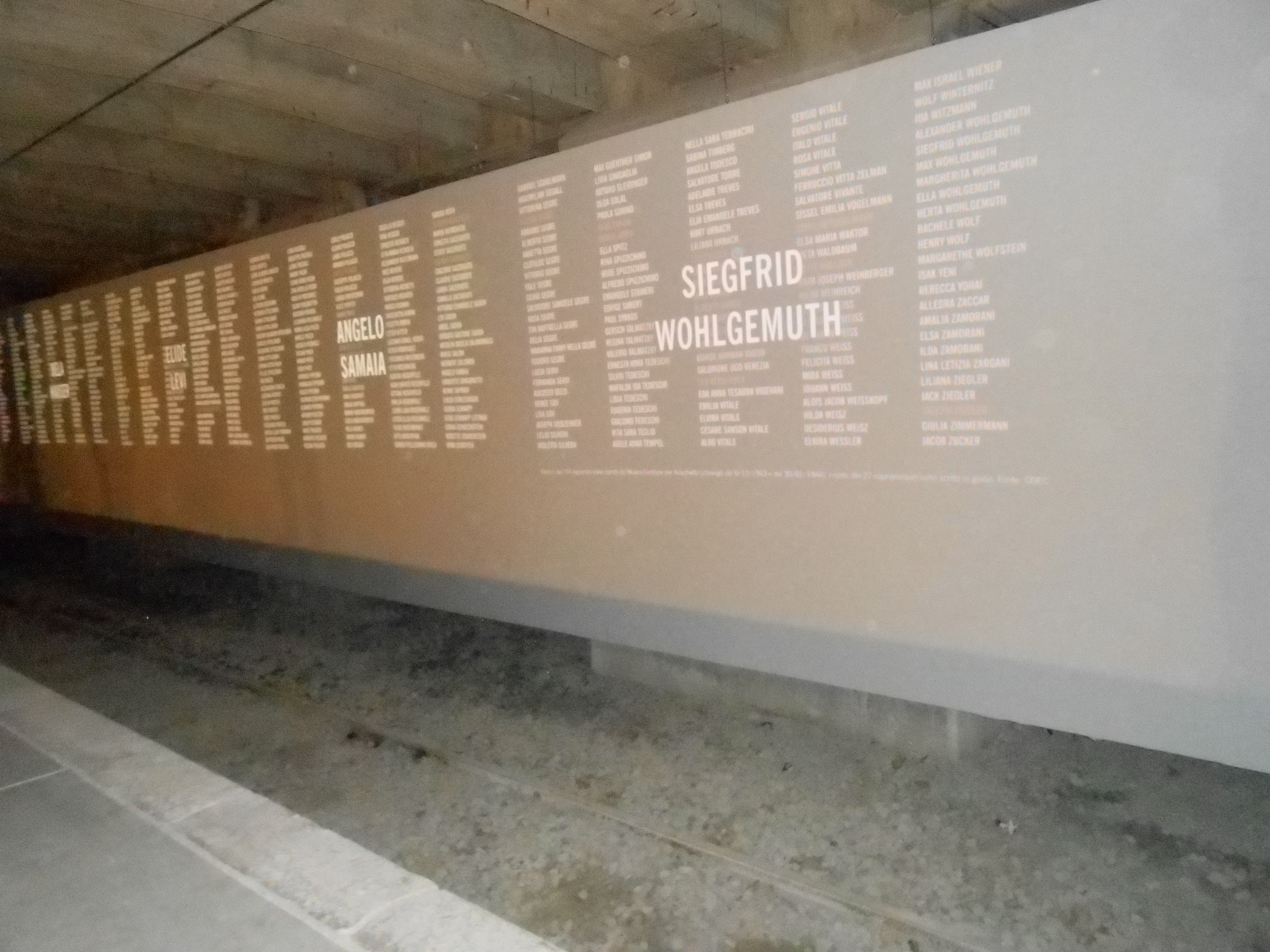
The wall of names at the Memoriale della Shoah

=== Memoriale della Shoah ===
The Memoriale della Shoah is a Holocaust memorial in Milano Centrale railway station, dedicated to the Jewish people deported from a secret platform underneath the station to the extermination camps. It was opened in January 2013.

=== Borgo San Dalmazzo camp ===
No trace remains of the former Borgo San Dalmazzo concentration camp, but two monuments were erected to mark the events that took place there. In 2006 a memorial was erected at the Borgo San Dalmazzo railway station to commemorate the deportations. The memorial contains the names, ages and countries of origin of the victims as well as those of the few survivors. It also has some freight cars of the type used in the deportations.

=== Fossoli Camp ===
In 1996, a foundation was formed to preserve the former camp. From 1998 to 2003, volunteers rebuilt the fencing around the Campo Nuovo and, in 2004, one of the barracks that was used to house Jewish inmates was reconstructed.

== Italian Righteous Among the Nations ==
As of 2018, 694 Italians have been recognised as Righteous Among the Nations, an honorific used by the State of Israel to describe non-Jews who risked their lives during the Holocaust to save Jews from extermination by the Nazis.

The first Italians to be honoured in this fashion were Don Arrigo Beccari, Doctor Giuseppe Moreali and Ezio Giorgetti in 1964. Arguably the most famous of these is cyclist Gino Bartali, winner of the 1938 and 1948 Tour de France, who was honoured posthumously in 2014 for his role in saving Italian Jews during the Holocaust, never having spoken about it during his lifetime.

== The Italian Holocaust in literature and the media ==
=== Literature ===
Primo Levi, an Italian Jewish Auschwitz survivor, published his experience of the Holocaust in Italy in his books If This Is a Man and The Periodic Table. The novel The Garden of the Finzi-Continis by Giorgio Bassani deals with the fate of the Jews of Ferrara during the Holocaust and was made into a movie of the same name.

While Levi published his first works on the Shoah in the 1970s (L'osteria di Brema and Ad ora incerta), the first implicit account of the Italian Holocaust can be found in the allusions made by Eugenio Montale in his A Liuba che parte and later in Piccolo testamento and Il sogno del prigioniero, published in the section Conclusioni provvisorie of La bufera e altro. The subject matter was more explicitly developed by Salvatore Quasimodo and "in the prose poems collected by Umberto Saba in Scorciatoie e raccontini" (1946).

- Appelbaum, Eva. Flight from WWII Yugoslavia and Coming of Age in Italy (CreateSpace Independent Publishing Platform, 2018) ISBN 978-1719015172
- Bassani, Giorgio. The Garden of the Finzi-Continis (Everyman's Library, 2005) ISBN 978-1400044221
- Bassani, Giorgio. The Novel of Ferrara (W. W. Norton & Company, 2018) ISBN 978-0393080155
- Debenedetti, Giacomo. October 16, 1943 - Eight Jews (University of Notre Dame Press, 2001).
- Goldman, Louis. Friends for Life: The Story of a Holocaust Survivor and His Rescuers (Paulist Press, 2008) ISBN 978-0809145348
- Harmon, Amy. From Sand and Ash (Lake Union Publishing, 2016)
- Levi, Primo. Survival in Auschwitz (Simon & Schuster, 1996) ISBN 978-0684826806
- Levi, Primo. The Drowned and the Saved (Simon & Schuster, 2017) ISBN 978-1501167638
- Levi, Primo. The Reawakening (Touchstone, 1995) ISBN 978-0684826356
- Loy, Rosetta. First Words: A Childhood in Fascist Italy (Metropolitan Books, 2014)
- Marchione, Margherita. Yours Is a Precious Witness: Memoirs of Jews and Catholics in Wartime Italy (Paulist Press, 1997) ISBN 978-0809104857
- Millu, Liana. Smoke over Birkenau (Northwestern University Press, 1998) ISBN 978-0810115699
- Russo, Marisabina. I Will Come Back for You: A Family in Hiding in World War II (Dragonfly Books, 2014) ISBN 978-0385391498
- Segre, Dan Vittorio. Memoirs of a Fortunate Jew: An Italian Story (University of Chicago Press, 2008).
- Stille, Alexander. Benevolence and Betrayal: Five Italian Jewish Families Under Fascism (Summit Books, 1991).
- Vitale Ben Bassat, Dafna. Vittoria: A Historical Drama Based on A True Story (2016).
- Wolff, Walter. Bad Times, Good People: A Holocaust Survivor Recounts His Life in Italy During World War II (Whittier Pubn, 1999) ISBN 978-1576040911

=== Films ===
The Oscar-winners The Garden of the Finzi-Continis by Vittorio De Sica (1970) and Life Is Beautiful by Roberto Benigni (1997) are the two most famous movies on the Holocaust in Italy. Many more have been produced on the subject.

- 1949 - Monastero di Santa Chiara, directed by Mario Sequi
- 1960 - Everybody Go Home (Tutti a casa), directed by Luigi Comencini
- 1961 - Gold of Rome (L'oro di Roma), directed by Carlo Lizzani
- 1970 - The Garden of the Finzi-Continis (Il giardino dei Finzi-Contini), directed by Vittorio De Sica
- 1973 - Diario di un italiano, directed by Sergio Capogna
- 1976 - La linea del fiume, directed by Aldo Scavarda
- 1976 - Seven Beauties (Pasqualino Settebellezze), directed by Lina Wertmüller
- 1985 - The Assisi Underground, directed by Alexander Ramati
- 1997 - Memoria, directed by Ruggero Gabbai
- 1997 - The Truce (La tregua), directed by Francesco Rosi
- 1997 - Life Is Beautiful (La vita è bella), directed by Roberto Benigni
- 2000 - Il cielo cade, directed by Andrea Frazzi
- 2001 - Unfair Competition (Concorrenza sleale), directed by Ettore Scola
- 2001 - Senza confini - Storia del commissario Palatucci, directed by Fabrizio Costa
- 2001 - Perlasca - Un eroe italiano, directed by Alberto Negrin
- 2003 - Facing Windows (La finestra di fronte), directed by Ferzan Özpetek
- 2006 - Volevo solo vivere, directed by Mimmo Calopresti <documentary>
- 2007 - Hotel Meina, directed by Carlo Lizzani
- 2013 - Il viaggio più lungo, gli ebrei di Rodi, directed by Ruggero Gabbai
- 2014 - My Italian Secret: The Forgotten Heroes, directed by Oren Jacoby

== See also ==
- Japan and the Holocaust (The Holocaust and the other Axis power)
