= Karl Friedrich Titho =

German military officer (1911–2001)

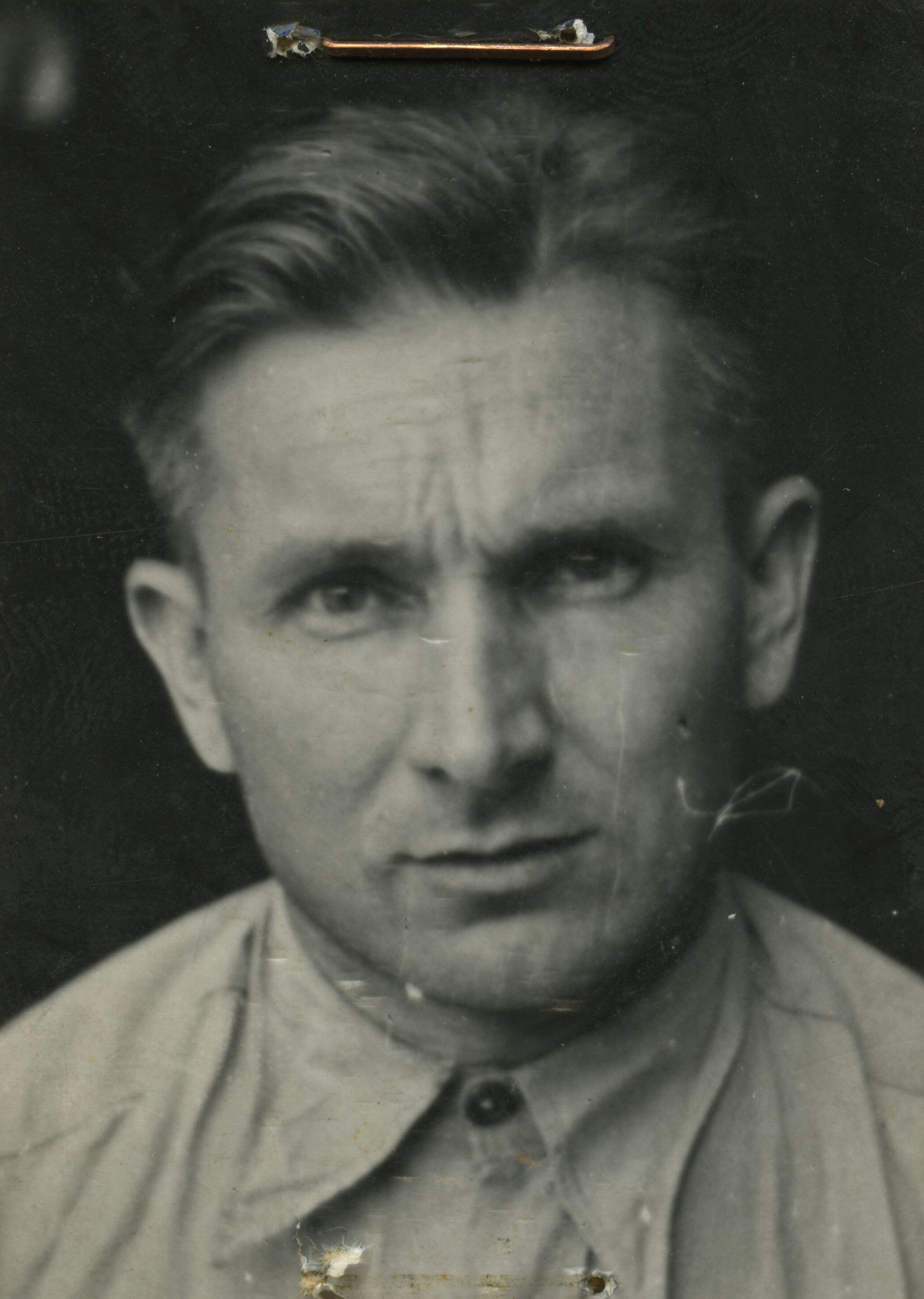
- Titho in the 1940s
- Born: 14 May 1911; Feldrom, German Empire
- Died: 18 June 2001 (aged 90); Horn-Bad Meinberg, Germany
- Military career
- Allegiance: Nazi Germany
- Branch: Schutzstaffel
- Rank: Untersturmführer
- Commands: Fossoli di Carpi Transit Camp Bolzano Transit Camp

Karl Friedrich Titho (14 May 1911 – 18 June 2001) was a German military officer (ranked SS-Untersturmführer), who as commander of the Fossoli di Carpi and Bolzano Transit Camps oversaw the Cibeno Massacre in 1944. Titho was jailed in the Netherlands after World War II for other war crimes committed there, released in 1953, and then deported to Germany. Despite an arrest warrant in Italy in 1954, Titho was never extradited to stand trial for his actions in Italy, and died in Germany in 2001, confessing and repenting his role in the atrocities just days before his death.

== Biography ==
Titho joined the SS in 1932 and the Nazi Party in 1933. From 1942 he was a guard at the Amersfoort concentration camp and moved to the Herzogenbusch concentration camp in 1943. His superior, Wilhelm Harster, was promoted to head of the Sicherheitsdienst in Italy in September 1943 and took Titho with him as his driver. Harster appointed Titho as camp commander of Fossoli di Carpi in May 1944 and, after the closure of Fossoli, Titho became commander of the Bolzano Transit Camp, a position he held until the end of the war.

== Cibeno massacre ==
Shortly before the Fossoli di Carpi camp was closed as a transit camp for Jews, on July 12, 1944, Camp Commander Titho oversaw the execution of 67 prisoners, in reprisal for a partisan attack on German soldiers at Genoa, in what became known as the Cibeno massacre. 70 prisoners were selected, and had their names read out by Titho, who told them they were being taken to Germany. Instead, they were trucked to a local shooting range and killed, but three managed to escape. For his role in the execution of the prisoners the Italian media latter referred to him as the Executioner of Fossoli.

During his time as commander at both camps, Titho's deputy was SS-Hauptscharführer Hans Haage, who was predominantly responsible for the political prisoners.

Shortly after the war, Commissioner of Criminal Police for the Province of Bolzano Arthur Schoster described Titho as "not an especially brutal type, rather a weak character who merely carried out the orders of his superiors" and as somebody that was mostly interested in having a comfortable life. Schoster, who did not know Titho well, thought that Titho was not directly responsible for the atrocities but certainly knew all about them. Schoster felt that Titho's deputy Haage was a cruel and brutal man, in truth running the Bolzano camp as Titho was too weak for the task.

Of the main German officers at Bolzano, Titho was the only one still present in the town during the allied liberation, as all others had escaped.

== After the war ==
In 1951 Titho was convicted in the Netherlands for war crimes committed while he was a camp guard there, having been involved in the execution of Soviet prisoners, and was sentenced to six years in jail. He was given an additional year for his mistreatment of Dutch prisoners, but was deported to Germany in 1953 after the Netherlands had declined an earlier extradition request by Italy in 1951.

In the early 1970s, his role in the Cibeno Massacre, and the deportation of Jewish camp inmates to Auschwitz from the Fossoli and Bolzano camps were investigated by the state prosecutor in Dortmund, Germany. The two heads of the department investigating Titho had both been members of the Nazi Party from an early date, and the case was terminated on grounds that it could not be proven that Titho knew that the Jews deported to Auschwitz would be killed there, and that, given the late state of the war, it was unclear whether they had eventually been killed at all. The official statement also held that the Cibeno reprisal for the partisan attack did not classify as murder but, at the most as manslaughter, and the charge was therefore invalid because of the statute of limitations.

== Deathbed confession ==
Shortly before his death Titho admitted that he was, as a member of the SS, guilty of crimes committed in his area of operation and that it had affected him all his life. He apologised to the victims and their family members.
