= Emanuele Fiano =

Italian politician (born 1963)

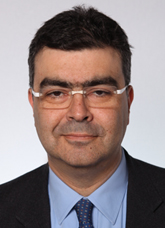

Member of the Chamber of Deputies
- In office 28 April 2006 – 13 October 2022
- Constituency: Lombardy 1

Personal details
- Born: 13 March 1963 (age 63) Milan, Italy
- Party: PDS (1996–1998); DS (1998–2007); PD (2007-2026)
- Education: Polytechnic University of Milan
- Profession: Architect

Emanuele "Lele" Fiano (born 13 March 1963) is an Italian politician and former member of Italy's Chamber of Deputies for the centre-left Democratic Party. A prominent figure in the Italian Jewish community, Fiano is a past president of the Jewish Community of Milan and former director of the Union of Jewish Communities in Italy.

== Early life and education ==
Born in Milan, Lombardy, Fiano is the son of Nedo Fiano, a Holocaust survivor who was deported to Auschwitz and was the sole survivor of his family. In his youth, Emanuele was a Jewish youth leader in the Hashomer Hatzair Socialist–Zionist youth movement in Milan.

Fiano attended the Politecnico di Milano, where he received his B.A. in architecture in 1988 and his PhD in urban architectural design in 2002. Afterwards he worked as a freelance architect.

== Political career ==
In 1996 Fiano was nominated to the Italian Chamber of Deputies, College Giambellino/San Siro in Milan, but was not elected. He was elected to the City Council of Milan in 1997 and was reelected in 2001.

In April 2006 he was elected to the Chamber of Deputies in Area III on the Olive list. He became a member of the Partito Democratico in May 2008 and was elected to the Constituent Assembly in the national primary in October 2007 on the list of Walter Veltroni. He was re-elected with the Partito Democratico in the April 2008 elections in Area III. As a parliamentarian, he served on the Commission of Transport, Posts and Telecommunications in 2008 and the Committee on the Safety of the Republic from May 2008 to January 2010. He is the home affairs spokesman for the Partito Democratico.

During the first congress of the Partito Democratico, he was a candidate for regional secretary of the party in Lombardy. He placed second in the primaries of 25 October 2009 with approximately 30% of the vote.

== Jewish activism ==
Fiano was the director of the Jewish Community of Milan from 1988 to 2001, serving as head of cultural programming. He became the president of the Community from 1998 to 2001. From 2001 to 2006 he was Director of the Union of Italian Jewish Communities.

Since 2005 Fiano has been the national secretary of Left for Israel, a political organization which promotes the views of the Israeli Left and combats anti-Israel bias. In this capacity, Fiano has promoted initiatives for intercultural coexistence, including Israeli-Palestinian dialogue. He has also supported the creation of a "Garden of the Righteous" in the Monte Stella in Milan.

== Family ==
He married Tamara Rabà, a psychologist from Milan, in 1989. The couple lived on a kibbutz in Israel for a year before returning to Italy. They have two sons, David and Michael.
