= RSI Police Order No. 5 =

1943 order for the Italian police to arrest Jews in German-occupied Italy

The RSI Police Order No. 5 (Italian: Ordinanza di polizia RSI n.5) was an order issued on 30 November 1943 in the Italian Social Republic (Italian: Repubblica Sociale Italiana, the RSI) to the Italian police in German-occupied northern Italy to arrest all Jews except those born of mixed marriages, which were required to be monitored by the police.

The order marked the final change of attitude of Fascist Italy towards the Jewish minority in the country, having gone from allowing active participation in the Fascist movement to the, official, start of discrimination with the Italian Racial Laws of 1938, to declaring them as of "enemy nationality" at the Congress of Verona in early November 1943 and, ultimately, to arrest and deportation to extermination camps with the Police Order No. 5 at the end of November.

The impact of the order can be judged by the fact that approximately half of the Jews arrested in Italy during the Holocaust were arrest by Italian police and the fact that Fascist Italy opened a number of concentration camps for arrested Jews immediately following the issue of the police order.

== Prelude ==
Up to 1938, the approximately 40,000 Italian Jews suffered far less persecution in Fascist Italy than the Jews in Nazi Germany did in the lead up to World War II. In the territories occupied by the Italian Army in Greece, France and Yugoslavia after the outbreak of World War II Jews even found protection from persecution.

This began to change with the Italian Racial Laws of 1938, when Jews lost their civil rights, including to property, education, and employment. Unlike Jews in other Axis-aligned countries, they were however not murdered or deported to extermination camps at this point.

On 25 July 1943, with the fall of the Fascist Regime, the situation in Italy temporarily changed, with inmates in internment camps gradually released, including Jewish prisoners. This process was however not completed by the time German authorities took over the camps in September 1943, after the Italian surrender on 8 September.

The attitude of the Italian Fascists towards Italian Jews drastically changed again in November 1943, after the Fascist authorities declared them to be of "enemy nationality" during the Congress of Verona and begun to actively participate in the prosecution and arrest of Jews. Initially, after the Italian surrender, the Italian police had only assisted in the round up of Jews when requested to do so by the German authorities. With the Manifest of Verona, in which Jews were declared to be foreigners and, in times of war, enemies, this changed.

== Order ==
The order was issued by phone by Guido Buffarini Guidi, Minister of the Interior of the Italian Social Republic on the evening of 30 November 1943 and confirmed the following day through telegram. The order specified the confiscation of their property and internment of all Jews except those born of mixed marriages, stipulating that the police should monitor the latter. It also specified that the arrested Jews should be held in concentration camps.

== Execution of order ==
Police Order No. 5 did not mark the start of the arrest, deportation and murder of Jews in Italy, which had begun almost immediately after the start of the German occupation in September. In case of the Raid of the Ghetto of Rome on 16 October 1943, when over 1,000 Jews were arrested to be deported and killed at Auschwitz, the Roman police had not participated and had not been asked to as the Germans considered them to be to unreliable.

Up to the issuing of the police order, Italian police had only assisted the Germans in the arrest and persecution of Jews when requested to. From 1 December 1943 it did so on its own accord. The Fascist Italian government also established concentration camps for arrested Jews following the issuing of Police Order No. 5, like the Fossoli camp, reopened in December 1943, which was eventually handed over to the Germans in March 1944.

The issue of Italian involvement in the Holocaust in Italy has, for many decades after the war, seen little attention in the country but it is estimated that approximately half of all Jews arrested during the Holocaust in Italy were arrested by the Italian police. In the 19 month of German occupation, from September 1943 to May 1945, twenty percent of Italy's pre-war Jewish population, 8,000 people, were killed by the Nazis. The actual Jewish population in Italy during the war was however higher than the initial 40,000 as the Italian government had evacuated 4,000 Jewish refugees from its occupation zones to southern Italy alone. By September 1943, 43,000 Jews were present in northern Italy and, by the end of the war, 40,000 Jews in Italy had survived the Holocaust.

== Amended order ==
Guido Buffarini Guidi amended his order ten days later, on 10 December, to now exclude Jews over the age of 70 or gravely ill from arrest. This change caused some confusion and was not well received by the Germans who wanted all Jews arrested and deported.

== Surviving documentation ==
Copies of the original order survive in various state archives in Italy.
