= Wilhelm Zoepf =

SS Sturmbannführer and figure in the Holocaust (1908–1980)

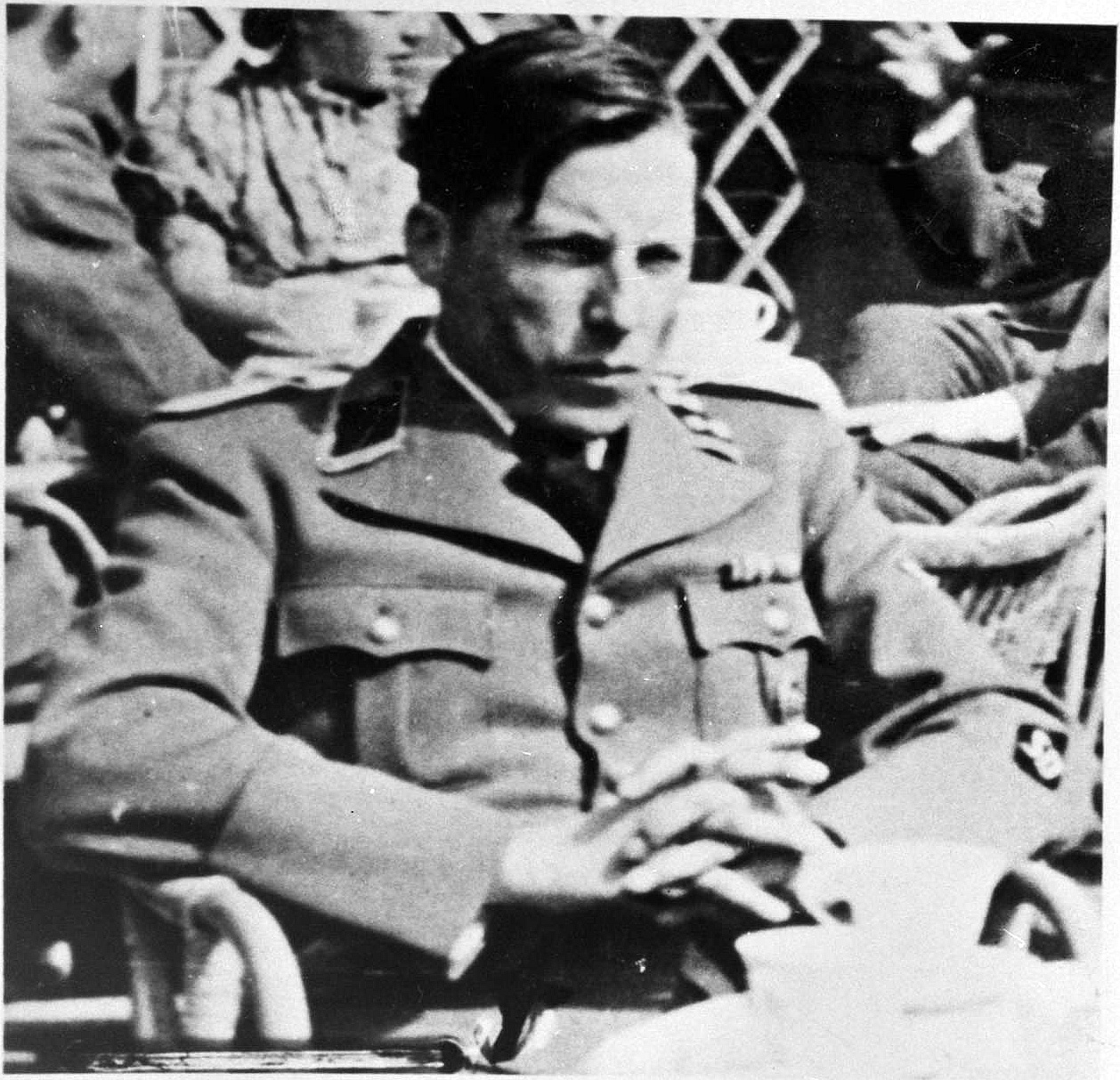
Wilhelm Zoepf

Wilhelm Zoepf, also rendered Zöpf, (11 March 1908 in Munich – 7 July 1980) was a German Schutzstaffel (SS) Sturmbannführer and a figure in the Holocaust.

== Early years ==
Educated at the Maximiliansgymnasium München, Zoepf was a lawyer by profession. He married in 1938 and divorced in 1957. Zoepf joined the Nazi Party in May 1933, also serving with the Hitler Youth until 1936. He joined the SS in 1937.

== Netherlands ==
Zoepf was attached to RSHA Referat IV B4 (RSHA Sub-Department IV-B4), the Jewish affairs and deportation agency headed by Adolf Eichmann. In this capacity Zoepf was sent by Eichmann in 1941 to the Netherlands in order to work alongside the Sicherheitspolizei (SiPo) in deportations. Here he became directly subordinate to SS General Wilhelm Harster, the pair being old friends. From their base in The Hague the duo ran the Department of Jewish Affairs for the Nazi occupiers in the Netherlands. In this role Zoepf oversaw the deportation of Jews to the concentration camps in the east. Most of his work was that of a bureaucrat although he took steps to ensure that deportation would not be disrupted, notably intercepting and destroying South American passports that were sent to some Jews and which would save them from deportation.

== Post-war ==
Following the end of the Second World War, Zoepf disappeared within the Netherlands and returned to Germany. In the 1960s Zoepf was brought to trial in Munich, along with Harster and Gertrud Slottke for his complicity in the killing of 83,000 Dutch Jews. After a trial that received high media attention Zoepf was sentenced to nine years imprisonment.
