= Ada Buffulini =

Italian anti-fascist

- Italian anti-fascist Ada Buffulini
- Born: 28 September 1912; Trieste, Italy
- Died: 3 July 1991 (aged 78)
- Occupation: Doctor
- Known for: Anti-Fascist campaigner

Ada Buffulini (28 September 1912 – 3 July 1991) was an Italian medical doctor and anti-Fascist campaigner, who led the resistance movement at Bolzano Transit Camp during the Second World War.

== Personal life ==
Buffulini was born in 1912 in Trieste, Italy. Aged 18, she moved to Milan to study medicine. She graduated in 1936. She met her husband Carlo Pierino at Bolzano Transit Camp, as they had both been deported there.

== Campaigning ==
Buffulini joined the Italian Socialist Party after the September 1943 Air raid on Frascati. She moved underground in Milan in November.

On 4 July 1944, Buffulini was arrested in Milan. She was at the house of Maria Arata, attending an Italian Socialist Party meeting. The whole group were taken to San Vittore Prison, where Buffulini was held for two months. She was then deported to Bolzano Transit Camp, where she worked as a doctor in the Lager infirmary. Buffulini led the resistance movement at Bolzano, and kept in communication with Lelio Basso. At Bolzano, she also met Communist leader Carlo Venegoni. In February 1945, the SS locked Buffulini up in the cells.

In 2008, a road in Bolzano was dedicated to Buffulini on the 63rd anniversary of the liberation of the Bolzano camp.

== Publications ==
- Buffulini, Ada, The Bolzano Lager (1976)
