= Nedo Fiano =

Italian writer and Holocaust survivor (1925–2020)

Nedo Fiano (22 April 1925 – 19 December 2020) was an Italian Jewish writer and Holocaust survivor. He was a survivor of the Auschwitz concentration camp.

He was one of the most active contemporary witnesses to the experience of the Holocaust in Italy.

== Biography ==
Born in Florence to Olderigo Fiano (Siena, September 19, 1889 - Auschwitz concentration camp, October 3, 1944) and Nella Castiglioni (Florence, July 5, 1890 - Auschwitz Concentration Camp, May 23, 1944), he had an older brother, Enzo. After the enactment of Italian racial laws in 1938, he had to leave school at the age of thirteen because he was Judaism. He continued his studies at a small school organized independently within the Florentine Jewish community. Five years later, Italy signed an armistice with the Allies, while the Germans occupied central and northern Italy. Fiano and his family, all of Jewish origin, fled their home and sought refuge in the homes of friends. After struggling to find a place to stay, they found hospitality in the home of a friend of his father's (Armando Sontes).

On February 6, 1944, at the age of 18, the OVRA arrested him while he was walking along Via Cavour in Florence and imprisoned him in the city jail for being Jewish. He was then transferred to the transit Fossoli camp, together with eleven other members of his family.
