= Bolzano Transit Camp =

Concentration camp in Bolzano, Italy

Coordinates: 46°29′04″N 11°19′12″E

- Transit Camp
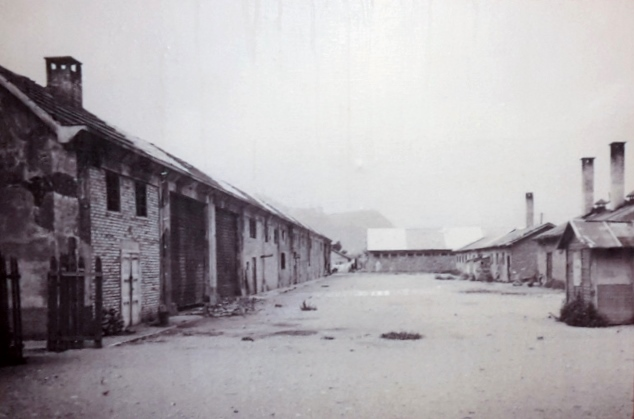
- Bolzano in 1945

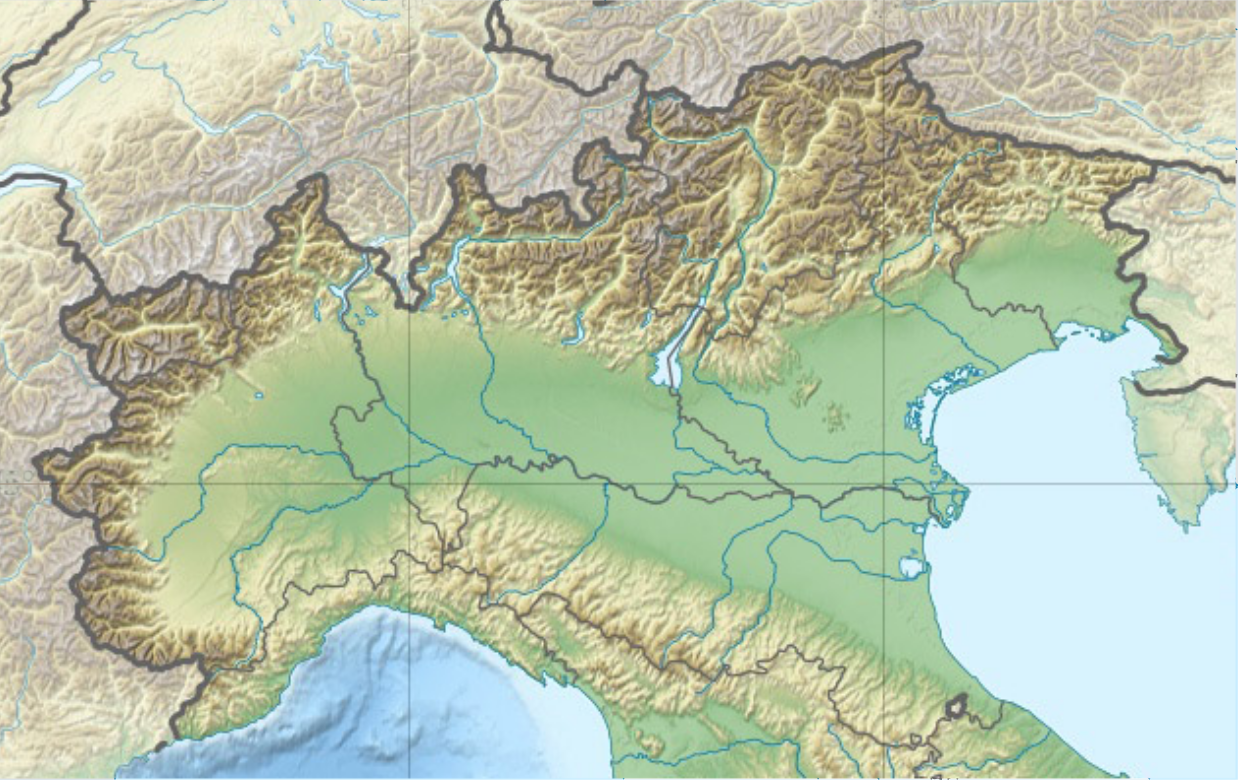
- Location within Northern Italy
- Other names: German: Polizei- und Durchgangslager Bozen
- Location: Bolzano, Operationszone Alpenvorland
- Operated by: SS
- Commandant: Wilhelm Harster Karl Friedrich Titho
- Operational: summer 1944–3 May 1945
- Inmates: Mostly political prisoners, also Italian Jews and Romani people
- Number of inmates: 11,000

Bolzano was a transit camp operated by Nazi Germany in Bolzano from 1944 to 3 May 1945 during World War II. It was one of the largest Nazi Lager on Italian soil, along with those of Fossoli, Borgo San Dalmazzo and Trieste.

== History ==
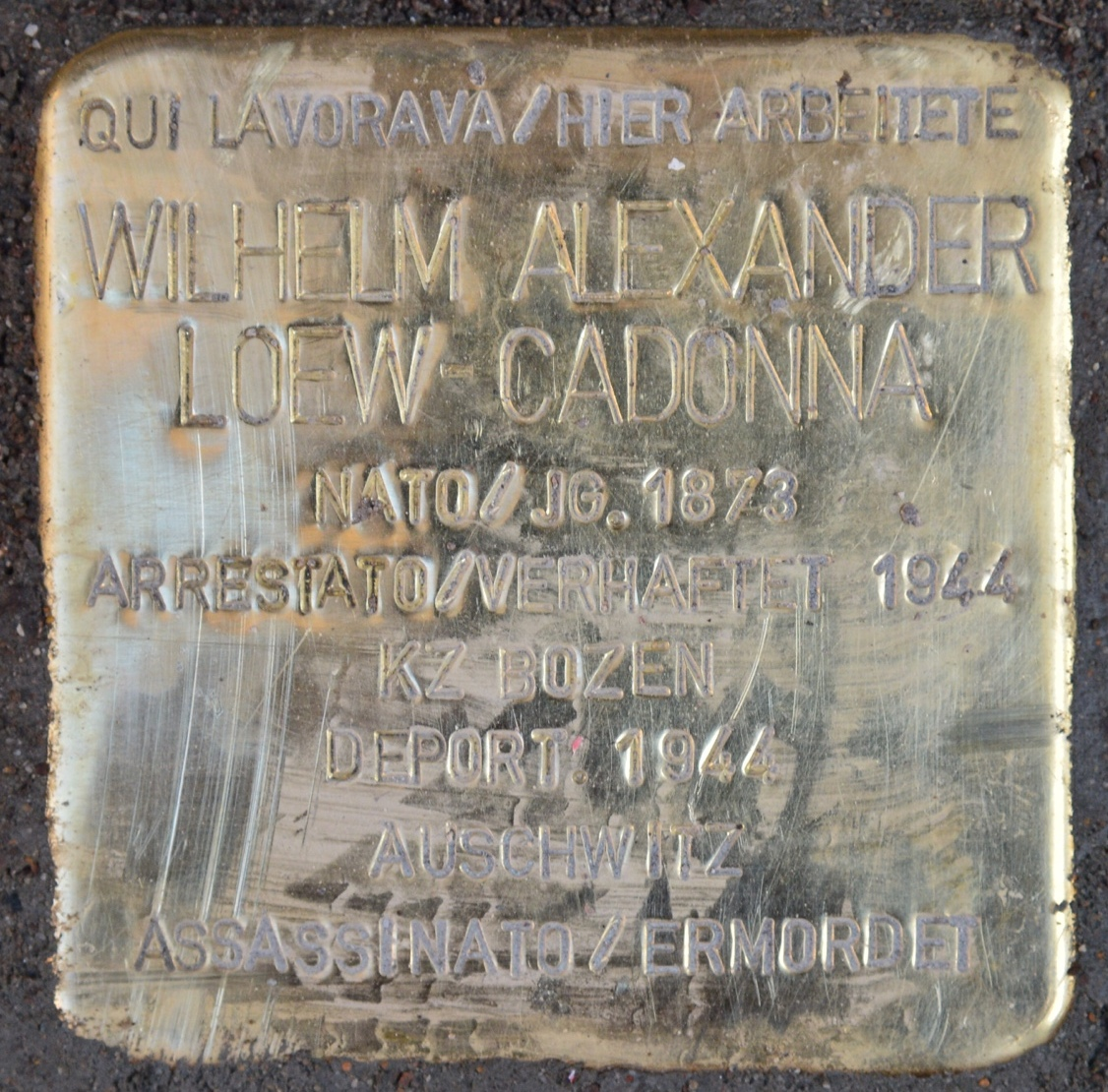
Stumbling stone (Stolperstein) for the victim Wilhelm Alexander Loew-Cadonna, a Transit camps inmate in 1944

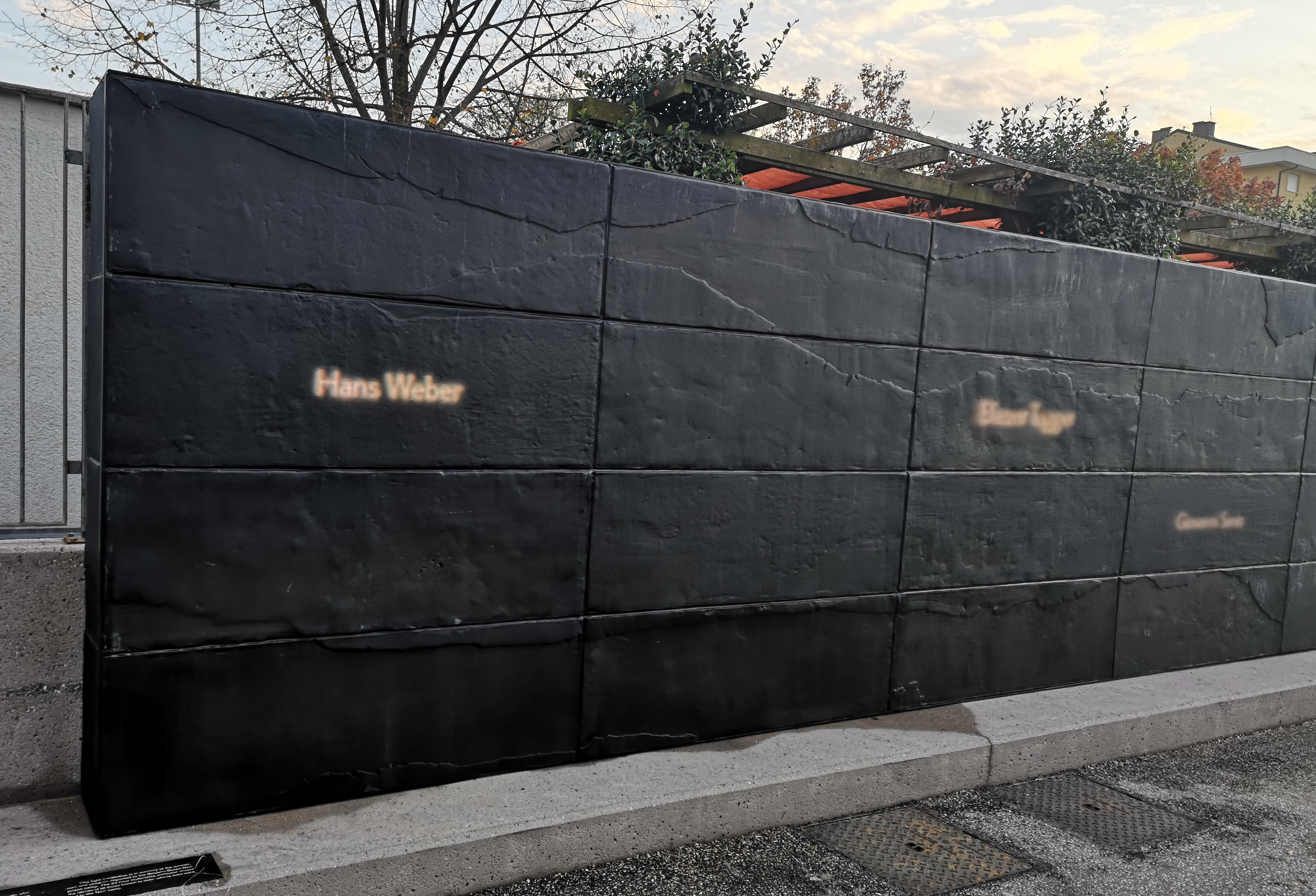
Memory wall at the former Bozen Nazi Concentration Camp in South Tyrol, erected in 2019

After the Allies signed the Armistice with Italy on September 8, 1943, Bolzano became the headquarters of the Prealpine Operations Zone and came under the control of the Nazi army. When the internment camp in Fossoli became vulnerable to Allied attack, it was dismantled, and a transit camp for prisoners headed for Mauthausen, Flossenbürg, Dachau, Ravensbrück and Auschwitz was set up in Bolzano.

Operational from the summer of 1944 and located in buildings previously occupied by the Italian Army, the transit camp hosted about 11,000 prisoners from middle and northern Italy in its ten months of activity. Although the camp's population consisted mostly of political opponents, Jewish and Romani people (i.e., gypsy) deportees also passed through its barracks. A portion of the prisoners—approximately 3,500 people of all ages—was transferred to one of the Lagers, while the rest were assigned to work in loco as free labor, either in the camp workshops and labs, in local firms, or in the apple orchards.

The interned prisoners were freed between April 29 and May 3, 1945, when the camp was closed to prevent the advancing Allied troops from witnessing its living conditions and (presumably) to eliminate evidence. The SS troops destroyed all documentation relating to camp activities before withdrawing, following the standing order that no trace be left behind.

== The camp ==
The camp was originally set to host 1,500 people. For this purpose, two sheds were divided into six blocks, one of which was reserved for women. The camp was then progressively enlarged until it reached a stated capacity of 4,000 prisoners.

As was customary in Nazi internment camps, each block was assigned a letter and a specific "type" of prisoner. In block A lived permanent residents, who were treated somewhat better than the others because of their involvement in essential camp activities (especially administration); in blocks D and E were kept political prisoners, regarded by the Nazis as the greatest danger and therefore kept segregated from other prisoners; block F was reserved for women and the occasional child.

Jewish male deportees, whose transit was often short-lived, were crammed in block L. There was also a prison block hosting approximately 50 inmates.

The camp was directed by the Verona SS, whose chief was the Brigadeführer (brigade general) of Gestapo Wilhelm Harster; the camp's executive directors were Untersturmführer Karl Friedrich Titho and Hauptscharführer Haage, who headed a garrison of German, Swiss and Ukrainian soldiers.

== Sub-camps ==
Bolzano camp was the only one, in Italy, to have attached forced-labour camps (Außenlager). Of these, the most important ones were in Merano, Schnals, Sarntal, Moos in Passeier and Sterzing.

== Resistance ==
As in most camps where political prisoners abounded, a resistance movement arose, organized along three axes:

- a political wing, organized by the CLN and some partigiani;
- a movement spearheaded by priests (most of them, accused of having helped wanted civilians, were imprisoned along with those they had sought to protect);
- spontaneous acts of civil resistance by citizens who sought to prevent deportation of others protected escaped prisoners or attempted to organize escapes from the camp.

== Trials ==
In January 1946, an American military court sentenced SS officers Heinrich Andergassen, August Schiffer, and Albert Storz to death by hanging for the murders of five American POWs, including OSS agent Roderick Stephen Hall, and two British POWs. A fourth man, Gendarmeriewachtmeister Hans Butz, was sentenced to life in prison specifically for his involvement in the murder of Hall. Andergassen, Schiffer, and Storz were executed at an American military stockade in Livorno on 26 July 1946.

In November 2000, the military court of Verona sentenced Michael Seifert, a Ukrainian SS known in the camp as "Misha", to life in prison in absentia for the atrocities he committed against deportees, particularly those held in the jail block.

The relative recency of this trial is because the case had remained hidden for decades and resurfaced with the discovery of the so-called armadio della vergogna (lit., "cabinet of shame") in 1994. Among the prisoners that Seifert and his accomplice Otto Sein tortured was a young Mike Bongiorno, an American POW who would go on to become one of Italy's most beloved TV figures after war.

Seifert, who had emigrated to Canada after the war, had to face 18 counts of murder and 15 additional counts of misconduct. He was tracked down in Vancouver, only days before the trial was to begin, by a reporter working for the Vancouver Sun, who acted upon information provided by the Associazione nazionale ex deportati politici nei campi nazisti (ANED) (National Association of former political deportees to Nazi internment camps). Seifert was extradited to Italy in 2008, where he died in prison in 2010.

His story was reconstructed by the Italian historians Giorgio Mezzalira and Carlo Romeo in the book entitled Mischa, jailer of the Bolzano lager.

A separate trial of the camp directors, Titho and Haage, had taken place in 1999, with a different outcome: Titho was absolved for lack of evidence, while Haage was sentenced posthumously.

== Famous inmates ==
- Mike Bongiorno
- Ada Buffulini
- Grete De Francesco
- Franz Jung

== Sources ==
1. Feragni, Enea (1945). Un uomo, tre numeri. Milan: Speroni.
2. Agosti, Giannantonio (1968). Nei lager vinse la bontà. Memorie dell'internamento nei campi di eliminazione tedeschi. Edizioni missioni estere dei padri Cappuccini.
3. Happacher, Luciano (1979). Il Lager di Bolzano, con appendice documentaria. Trento.
4. Wetzel, Juliane (1994). Das Polizeidurchgangslager Bozen. In Wolfgang Benz, Barbara Distel: Die vergessenen Lager (Dachauer Hefte 5). Munich.
5. Mezzalira, Giorgio (1995). "Mischa". L'aguzzino del Lager di Bolzano. Bolzano.
6. Giacomozzi, Carla (1995). L'ombra del buio / Schatten, die das Dunkel wirft. Stadt Bozen / Comune di Bolzano.
7. Mezzalira, Giorgio (2002). Anche a volerlo raccontare è impossibile. Bolzano: Circolo ANPI di Bolzano.
8. Pfeifer, Barbara (2003). Im Vorhof des Todes. Das Polizeiliche Durchgangslager Bozen 1944–1945. Innsbruck: University of Innsbruck.
9. Rauch, Anita (2003). Polizeiliches Durchgangslager Bozen. Innsbruck: University of Innsbruck.
10. Venegoni, Dario (2004). Uomini, donne e bambini nel Lager di Bolzano. Una tragedia italiana in 7,982 storie individuali. Milan: Mimesis. ISBN 978-88-8483-224-5.
11. Venegoni, Dario (2004). Männer, Frauen und Kinder im Durchgangslager von Bozen. Eine italienische Tragödie in 7800 persönlichen Geschichten. Bolzano.
12. Ratschiller, Ludwig (2005). Autobiografia di un partigiano. Bolzano: Circolo ANPI di Bolzano.
13. Villani, Cinzia (2005). Va una folla di schiavi. Lager di Bolzano e lavoro coatto (1944-1945). Geschichte und Region/Storia e regione, 15, pp. 113–46.
14. Mayr, Sabine; Obermair, Hannes (2014). "Sprechen über den Holocaust. Die jüdischen Opfer in Bozen — eine vorläufige Bilanz". Der Schlern. Der Schlern, 88,3, pp. 4–36. ISSN 0036-6145.
15. Di Sante, Costantino (2018). Criminali del campo di concentramento di Bolzano. Deposizioni, disegni, foto e documenti inediti. Bolzano: Edition Raetia. ISBN 978-88-7283-674-3.
