= Fossoli camp =

WWII concentration camp in Italy

- Concentration camp
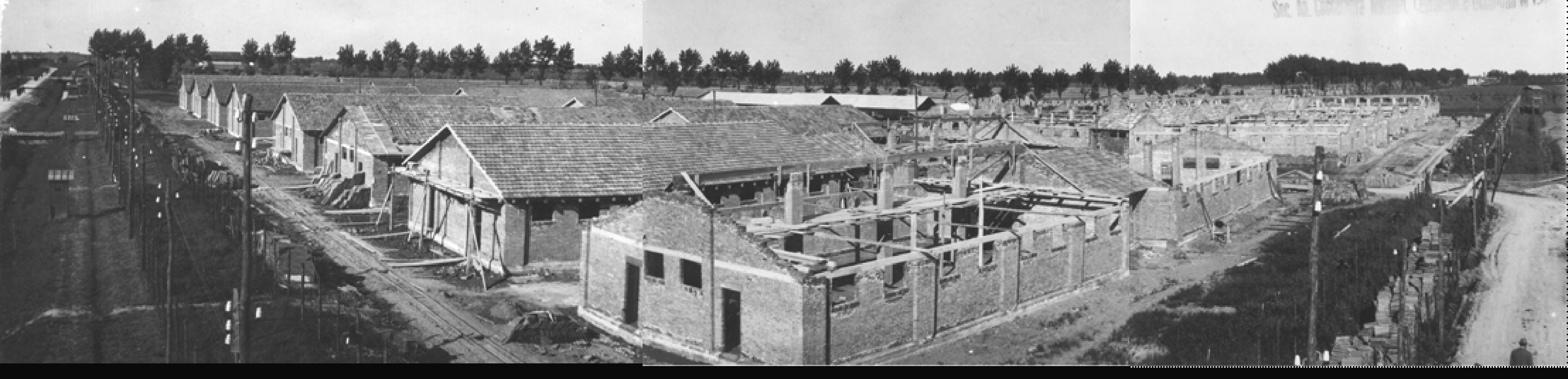
- Panorama of the camp

- Location within Italy
- Coordinates: 44°49′42″N 10°54′10″E
- Location: Carpi, Italy
- Commandant: Domenico Avitabile Mario Taglialatela Karl Friedrich Titho
- Operational: 1942
- Notable inmates: Primo Levi
- Notable books: The Periodic Table

The Fossoli camp (Italian: Campo di Fossoli) was a concentration camp in Italy, established during World War II and located in the village of Fossoli, Carpi, Emilia-Romagna. It began as a prisoner of war camp in 1942, later being a Jewish concentration camp, then a police and transit camp, a labour collection centre for Germany, and finally, a refugee camp before closing in 1970.

It is estimated that 2,844 Jews passed through this camp, 2,802 of whom were then deported.

== History ==
=== Prisoner of war camp ===
The camp was established by the Royal Italian Army on 30 May 1942 for the British, South African, and New Zealand military personnel captured in military operations in North Africa and originally called Campo PG 73. On 22 July 1942, 1,800 prisoners of war were moved to the camp and accommodated in 191 tents in what was called the "Old Camp," the Campo Vecchio. With the surrender of Italy on 8 September 1943, the camp was evacuated and all prisoners of war were moved to Germany.

=== Concentration camp ===
After the surrender, the camp was enlarged by 60 wooden and 20 stone barracks, which became the "New Camp," the Campo Nuovo. In December the camp was renamed Fossoli di Carpi and became the "national concentration camp" for the Jews in the Italian Social Republic, following the issue of RSI Police Order No. 5. The camp was operated by fascist Italian militias. Police captain Domenico Avitabile was the first Italian commandant of the concentration camp, succeeded by Mario Taglialatela. Avitabile was described by former inmates as a kind but corrupt man, while Taglialatela was described as cruel and as mistreating the prisoners.

In March 1944, owing to the camp's strategic location close to the Modena–Verona railway line, the Campo Nuovo came under German control and was renamed Transit Camp Carpi. It now fell under the jurisdiction of the German Commander in Chief of the Security Police, Wilhelm Harster, who was based in Verona, while the Campo Vecchio remained under Italian control. SS-Untersturmführer Karl Friedrich Titho was appointed as commander of the German part of the camp, with SS-Hauptscharführer Hans Haage as his deputy, while the guards consisted of 40 Italians, later reinforced by five Ukrainians.

The purpose of the camp was to act as a transit camp, and it was to be filled to capacity with Italian Jews, and, once full, these were to be deported predominantly to Auschwitz for extermination. It was during this period that the first two trains left on 19 and 22 February 1944, intended for Anglo-Libyan prisoners heading to Bergen-Belsen and Auschwitz, with the camp still under Italian control. The second convoy left with 650 other prisoners (which Primo Levi recalls on the first few pages of the famous book If This Is a Man).

During Titho's time as camp commander at Fossoli di Carpi, 67 prisoners were executed in the Cibeno massacre as a reprisal for a partisan attack on German soldiers at Genoa. On 12 July 1944, 70 prisoners were selected on the pretext of being taken to Germany, and their names were read out by Titho, who moved them on trucks to a local shooting range, and 67 of them were executed, while three managed to escape. For his role in the execution of the prisoners, the Italian media later referred to him as the Executioner of Fossoli.

During its existence as a transit camp, the camp had a total of 5,000 inmates, of which around half were Jewish. The last transport for Auschwitz left the camp on 26 June 1944, Fossoli having become too insecure because of the proximity to the front line, and was replaced with the Bolzano Transit Camp, with Titho and Haage as the commander and deputy commander as well. Following the final deportation of Jews, the camp was used for the deportation of forced labour to Germany, with as many as 800 to 1,000 people transiting through the camp daily. In November 1944 the camp ceased operations.

=== After the Second World War ===
From November 1945 to May 1947 the camp was once more in use, now for foreign refugees, some of them Jewish Holocaust survivors.

In 1947 the camp was converted into a refuge for war orphans, by Father Zeno Saltini. The Church ordered Saltini to leave in February 1952, and the community was closed with huge debts. There was a satellite community in Maremma which today comprises the intentional community of Nomadelfia.

The camp reopened once more from 1954 to 1970 to serve as accommodation for ethnic Italian refugees from Yugoslavia before it finally closed.

== Commemoration ==
In 1996 a foundation was formed to preserve the former camp. From 1998 to 2003 volunteers rebuilt the fencing around the Campo Nuovo and in 2004, one of the barracks that used to house Jewish inmates was reconstructed.

== Notable inmates ==
- Roberto Angeli
- Nedo Fiano
- Mario Finzi
- Odoardo Focherini
- Primo Levi
- Liana Millu
- Teresio Olivelli
- Raimondo Ricci
- Francesco Venturelli
- Riccardo Di Luca
- Armando Vezzelli
- Jerzi Sas Kulczycki
- Carlo Bianchi
- Leopoldo Gasparotto

== Gallery ==
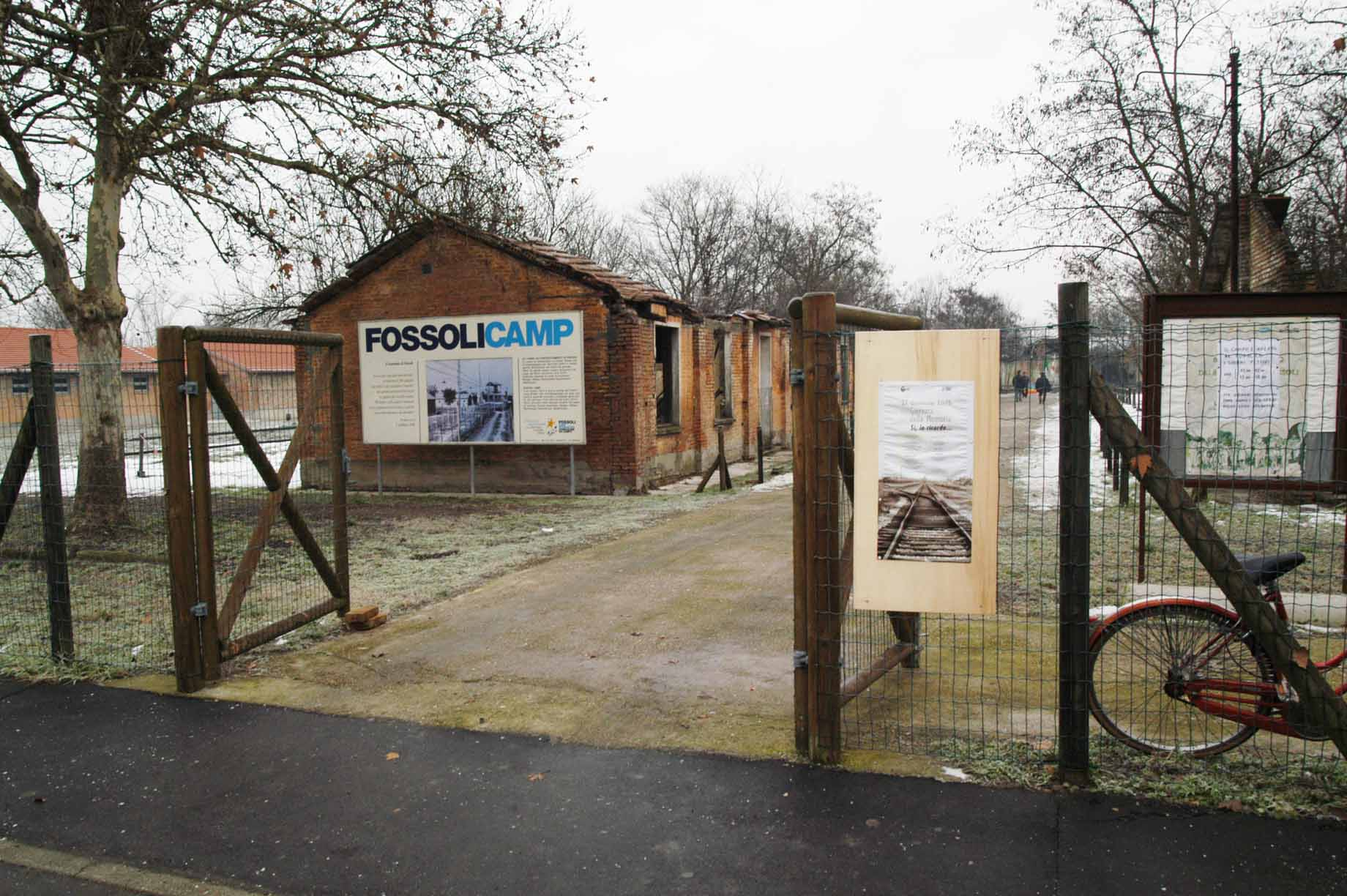
Camp today

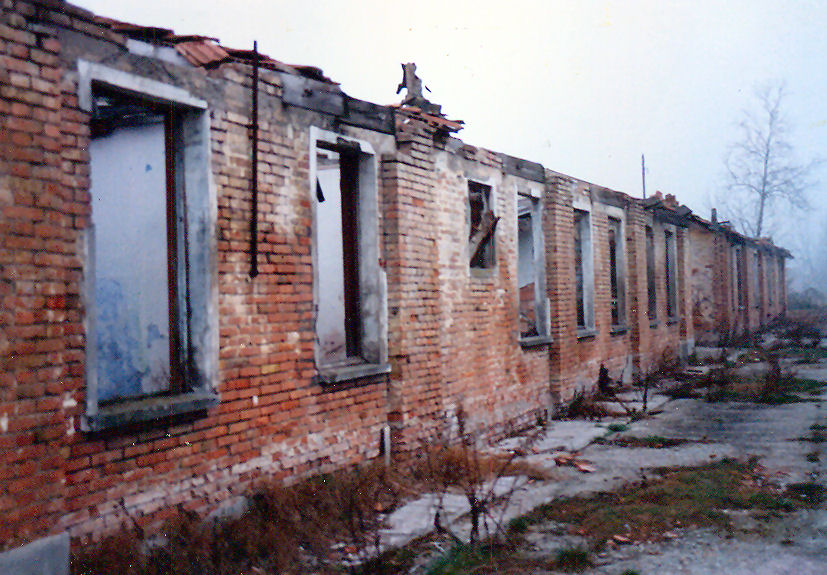
Barracks

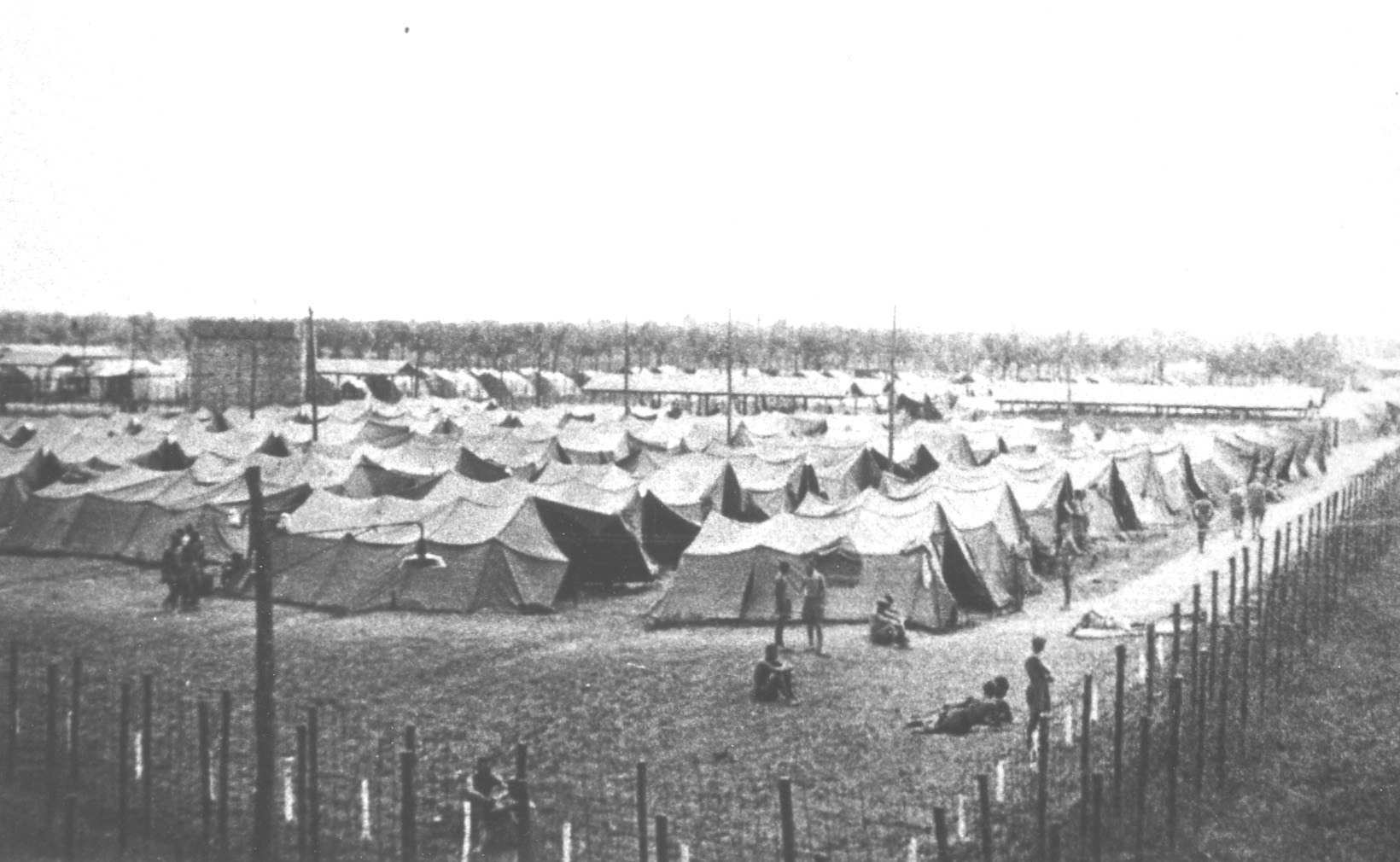
Allied POW camp

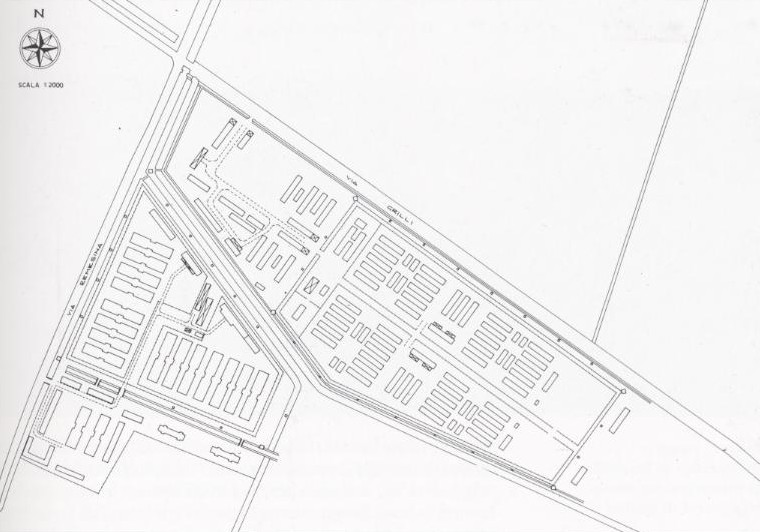
Camp's plan

== See also ==
- Holocaust in Italy
- The Holocaust
