= Grete De Francesco =

Austro-Hungarian author (1893–1945)

- Born: Margarethe Weissenstein; November 5, 1893; Vienna, Austria-Hungary
- Died: February/March 1945 probably in Ravensbrück concentration camp
- Occupation: Author
- Spouse: Giulio De Francesco
- Writing career
- Subject: Charlatanism
- Notable work: The Power of the Charlatan

Grete De Francesco (born Margarethe Weissenstein; 5 November 1893, Vienna, Austria-Hungary – February/March 1945, probably in the Ravensbrück concentration camp) was a German-speaking writer.

Her book Die Macht des Charlatans from 1937 is internationally regarded as a scientific standard and reference work on the topic of charlatanism. It was translated to English (The Power of the Charlatan) in 1939. In the 1930s, De Francesco wrote many cultural studies essays on border areas of medicine for the in-house journal of the Basel-based Ciba Group.

== Life ==
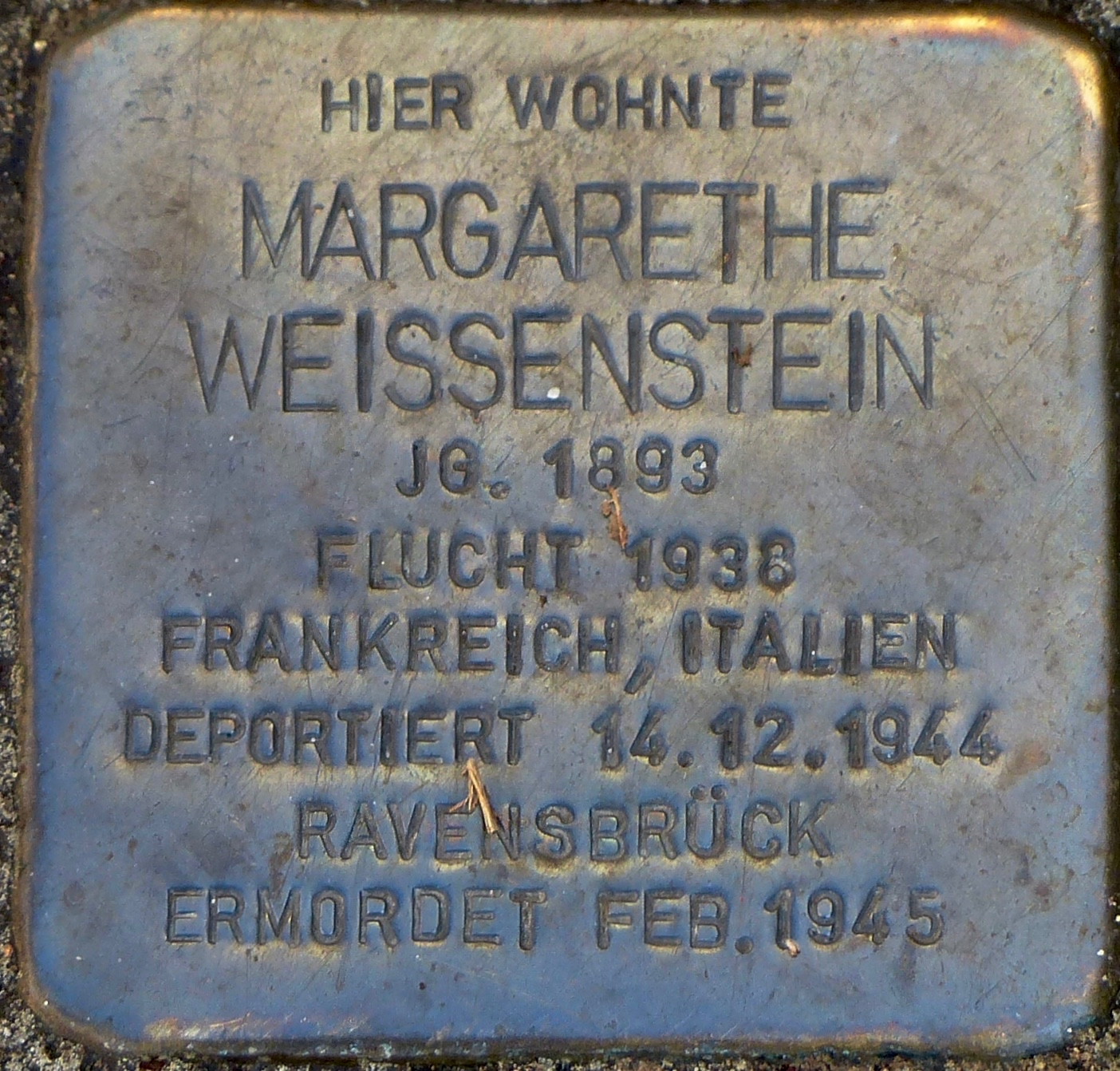
The first Stolperstein in Salzburg in 2015

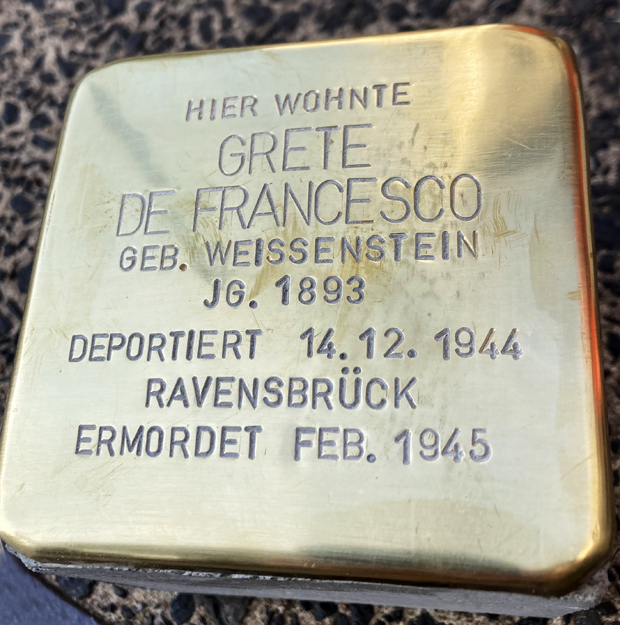
Grete De Francesco Stolperstein 2022

Margarethe Weissenstein was the oldest of three daughters of the Jewish couple Else and Emanuel Weissenstein. Her father was general director of the Vereinigte Jutefabriken in Vienna and Budapest. She studied at the Ludwig-Maximilians-Universität München, married Giulio De Francesco, an engineer from the South Tyrolean Rovereto, lived with him in Milan, then since the mid-twenties in Berlin, where she became the first female graduate at the Deutsche Hochschule für Politik with her diploma thesis "The Face of Italian Fascism" (1931). She wrote features for the Frankfurter Zeitung and was in contact with Walter Benjamin, Ernst Bloch, Siegfried Kracauer, Karl Mannheim and Albert Salomon. In 1932, she was a member of the editorial board for a short time, afterwards she wrote as a freelancer, partly also under the pseudonym Anton Pacher and continued to provide contributions to the paper. From 1933, she lived as a permanent border crosser between Vienna, Prague, Paris, Basel, Zurich and Milan, which had been under German occupation since September 1943. She was spied on and sought refuge in Upper Italian mountain villages, and she hid for several months in a madhouse for women, but then returned to her Milan apartment, where she was arrested by the SS in October 1944. Through the Bolzano transit camp she was deported to the Ravensbrück concentration camp in December 1944, where she was probably killed in February 1945.

Until 2023, there was no public portrait photo of De Francesco. In March 2023, the Italian Centro di Documentazione Ebraica Contemporanea published photos from a personal correspondence by De Francesco.

A stolperstein was placed via Renato Fucini 5 in Milan on March 7, 2024.

== Publications (selection) ==
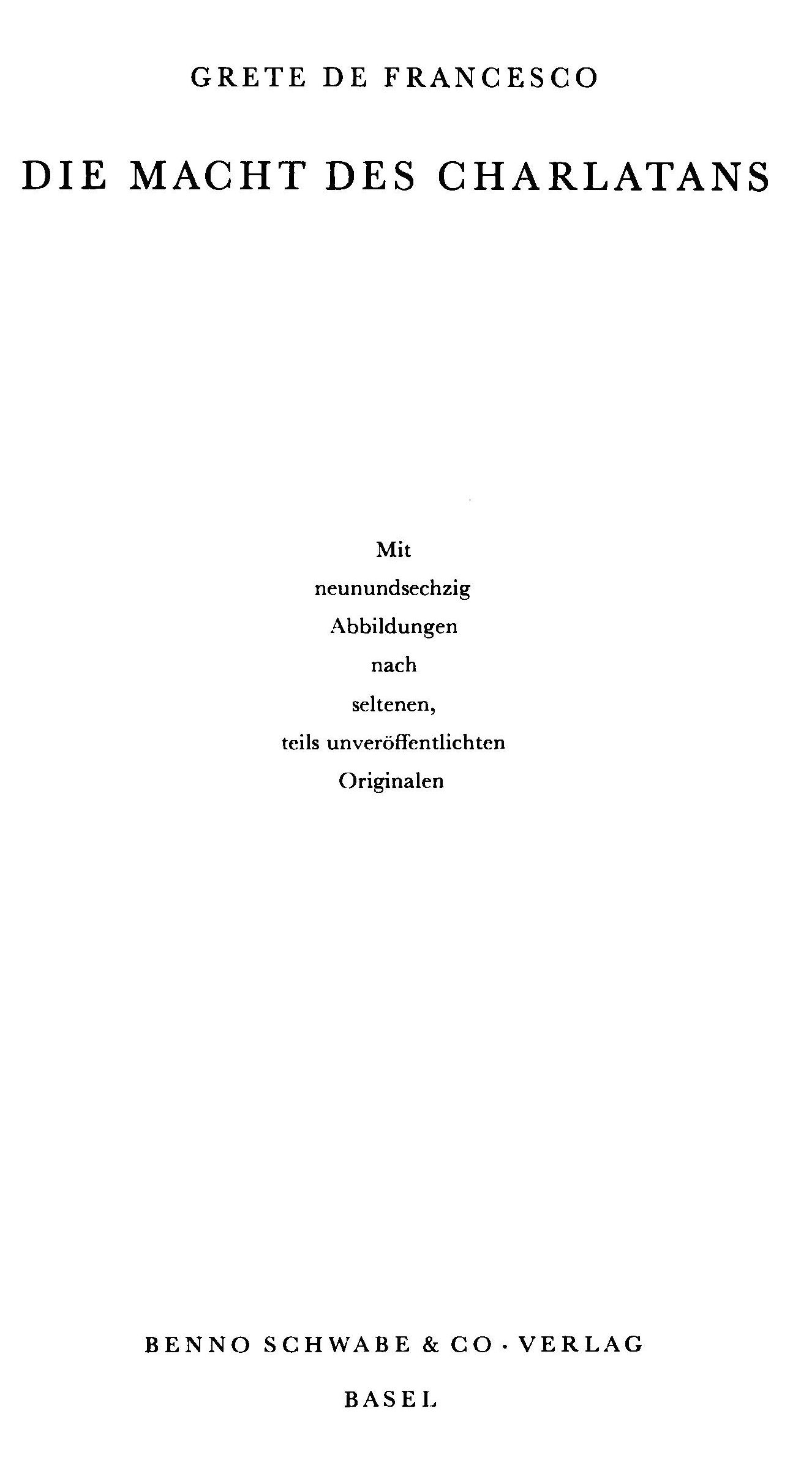
Die Macht des Charlatans (1937)

- Die Macht des Charlatans. 69 Abb., 258 S., Bibliographie, Register. Schwabe Verlag, Basel 1937.
  - English translation: The Power of the Charlatan. Translated by Miriam Beard. VII+288 p. Yale University Press, New Haven 1939.
  - Reprint Januar 2021, 69 Abb., 456 S., with a biographical essay by Volker Breidecker. AB – Die Andere Bibliothek, Berlin, ISBN 978-3-8477-0434-8.
- Contributions for house magazines of Ciba, Basel, especially for the Ciba magazine. The publisher was the scientific department of the Society for Chemical Industry in Basel. The magazine, illustrated with historical pictures, appeared in 132 issues from 1933 to 1952 and had set itself the program to “treat in small excerpts such border areas in which medicine touches with ethnology, history, cultural and art history or other disciplines.”
- Contributions and English, French and Dutch translations of their essays in Ciba-Rundschau, CIBA Review and Ciba symposia, plus further individual publications.

== Sources ==
- Joseph Roth: Die Macht des Charlatans. (Rezension). In: Das Neue Tage-Buch. Paris und Amsterdam, Jg. 5, H. 5, v. 29. Januar 1938, S. 119, (wieder in: Joseph Roth: Werke 3. Das Journalistische Werk 1929-1939. Köln 1991, S. 780–782) from the Austrian National Library.
- Walter Benjamin: Grete de Francesco, Die Macht des Charlatans. (Rezension). In: Gesammelte Schriften III, Kritiken und Rezensionen 1932–1940. [1938]. Suhrkamp Taschenbuch Verlag 1991 from Project Gutenberg.
- Iris Ritzmann: Medikus und Scharlatan – Szenen einer innigen Feindschaft (Teil 1). In: Schweizerische Ärztezeitung. 90(3):84–88, bei: Zora, Universität Zürich, 2009 (PDF)
- Bernhard Guttmann: In memoriam (Grete de Francesco). In: Die Gegenwart. Eine Halbmonatsschrift. Freiburg im Breisgau, Nummer 42/43, 2. Jg. (Nr. 17/18), 30. September 1947, S. 22.
- John Ganz: Why We Are So Vulnerable to Charlatans Like Trump. In: The New York Times, 12. Juni 2018.
