= Cibeno massacre =

- Part of the aftermath of the German invasion of Italy (during World War II)
- Location: Cibeno
- Date: 12 July 1944
- Attack type: Mass murder
- Deaths: 67
- Perpetrator: SS under the command of Lieutenant Karl Müller

The Cibeno massacre was a massacre carried out by the SS on 12 July 1944 at the shooting range of Cibeno, a fraction- now a district - of Carpi, in which 67 people already imprisoned in the Fossoli camp died. Among the victims were a number of notable Italian partisans, including Carlo Bianchi, Jerzy Sas Kulczycki, Felice Lacerra, Michele Levrino and Giuseppe Robolotti.

It has been defined as "the most heinous act committed in SS-occupied Italy on people interned in a concentration camp".
