= Wilhelm Harster =

German Nazi police official and SS general (1904–1991)

- Harster in 1949

Personal details
- Born: 21 July 1904 Kelheim, Kingdom of Bavaria, German Empire
- Died: 25 December 1991 (aged 87) Munich, Germany
- Education: Ludwig-Maximilians-Universität München
- Occupation: Lawyer; Civil servant

Military service
- Allegiance: Weimar Republic; Nazi Germany
- Branch/service: Freikorps; Reichswehr; Schutzstaffel; German Army
- Years of service: 1920–1926; 1933–1945
- Rank: Gruppenführer and Generalleutnant of Police
- Unit: Sicherheitspolizei (SiPo) and Sicherheitsdienst (SD)
- Commands: Commander, SiPo and SD (Krakow, 1939; Netherlands, 1940–1943; Italy, 1943–1945)
- Awards: German Cross in gold Iron Cross, 1st and 2nd class War Merit Cross, 1st and 2nd class with swords
- Criminal information
- Convictions: War crimes Crimes against humanity
- Penalty: 12 years imprisonment (1949); 15 years imprisonment (1967)

Wilhelm Harster (21 July 1904 – 25 December 1991) was a German lawyer, police official and convicted war criminal. An SS-Gruppenführer in the Schutzstaffel (SS), he commanded German security police and intelligence services in Kraków, the Netherlands and northern Italy during the Second World War. A Holocaust perpetrator, he was convicted by a Dutch court and sentenced to 12 years imprisonment. After an early release, he returned to Germany and was employed by the state government of Bavaria as a civil servant but was dismissed after a public outcry, though he retained his full pension. He was again tried, convicted and sentenced to 15 years for complicity in the murder of 83,000 Dutch Jews.

== Early life and education ==
Harster was born in Kelheim, the son of a lawyer and police official. He attended Volksschule and a humanist Gymnasium in Munich, receiving his Abitur in 1922. He then studied law at the Ludwig-Maximilians-Universität München from 1922 to 1926, passing his first state law examination that year and completing a doctorate of law degree in 1927. Following a legal clerkship, he passed his second state law examination in 1929, becoming an Assessor. Harster also served as a volunteer with the paramilitary Freikorps Oberland in Bavaria between 1920 and 1926 and was a reservist with the Reichswehr 19th (Bavarian) Infantry Regiment. On 16 October 1929, he joined the Kriminalpolizei (criminal police) in Stuttgart as a Regierungsassessor (government lawyer) in the German civil service. In spring 1931, he transferred into the political police, becoming its deputy leader in 1933.

== Police and SS career ==
Following the Nazi seizure of power, Harster joined the Nazi Party on 1 May 1933 (membership number 3,226,954). He also joined the Schutzstaffel (SS) on 9 November 1933 (serial number of 225,932). On 15 January 1934, he was named the Police Director of Tübingen and the leader of the Tubingen branch office of the political Landespolizei (state police). In May, he advanced to deputy leader of the state police for all of Württemburg and, in June, to the leader of the state police office in Berlin, an office he held until 31 March 1938. In the SS, Harster joined the Sicherheitsdienst (SD), the Nazi intelligence service, on 29 October 1935. From 15 January 1934, he was attached to SS-Oberabschnitt (main district) "Südwest" in Stuttgart. On 9 November 1937, he was transferred to the SD Main Office in Berlin, under Reinhard Heydrich, which became part of the Reich Security Main Office on 27 September 1939. Following the Anschluss with Austria, Harster was made the commander of the state police regional office in Innsbruck from 31 March 1938 to 1 June 1940. During his tenure there, he participated in the planning and execution of the Kristallnacht pogrom against the Jews in November 1938.

== Wartime commands and Holocaust involvement ==
Following the conquest of Poland in the Second World War, Harster served briefly as the Befehlshaber der Sicherheitspolizei und des SD (BdS) for Kraków in November 1939. From 30 November 1939 to 1 March 1941, he was the Inspekteur der Sicherheitspolizei und des SD (IdS) in Kassel. He was briefly recalled to military service in the Wehrmacht in June 1940, during the Battle of France as a member of a machine gun company in the Gebirgsjäger (light infantry) Replacement Regiment 136. From 19 July 1940 until 29 August 1943, he was the BdS in the Reichskommissariat Niederlande. He authorized the use of torture during interrogations of communist detainees in 1941, a practice extended to all prisoners the following year. As the security police commander, he was in charge of all the Gestapo in the occupied Netherlands. He was directly involved in the Holocaust by rounding up and transporting an estimated 104,000 Dutch Jews, including Anne Frank, to extermination camps.

Harster was transferred to northern Italy on 29 August 1943 as the BdS under SS-Obergruppenführer Karl Wolff. His headquarters were first in Verona where he oversaw the operations of the Fossoli camp a transit station for the deportation of Italian Jews to Auschwitz. In September 1943, after the Italian surrender to the Allies, Wolff selected Harster to recruit personnel and execute a raid on Vatican City to abduct Pope Pius XII and keep him from falling into the hands of the Allies. He was also to seize art treasures and documents, and to search the Vatican for political refugees and Jews. The plan, however, which had been directly assigned to Wolff by Adolf Hitler, ultimately was abandoned. Due to Allied advances in the summer of 1944, Harster moved his base of operations further north to Bolzano and was centered on the Bolzano Transit Camp where he continued transporting Italian Jews to Auschwitz. During his tenure there, he attained his last promotion on 9 November 1944, to the rank of SS-Gruppenführer and Generalleutnant of police. Harster remained in Bolzano until his capture on 10 May 1945 following the German surrender.

== Post-war prosecutions and criminal convictions ==
Harster was arrested by the British Army and was incarcerated at the Island Farm prisoner of war camp in Bridgend. On 1 April 1946, he was transferred to the London Cage and subsequently extradited to the Netherlands. He was put on trial in a one-day proceeding at a Dutch court in The Hague on 9 March 1949. He was found guilty and sentenced to 12 years imprisonment for his role in the persecution, deportation and murder of Dutch Jews and for his negligence in supervising the staff at the Amersfoort concentration camp. He was released from prison in 1953, after eight years in custody.

Upon release, Harster returned to Germany and obtained employment as a civil servant in Bavaria in 1956, becoming an Oberregierungsrat (senior government councilor) at the ministry of the interior. He was forced to retire due to public and media pressure in 1963, however he was allowed to retain his full pension. In January 1966, he was arrested in Munich and was put on trial the following year alongside two of his closest aides Wilhelm Zoepf and Gertrud Slottke. On 24 February 1967, He was convicted of complicity in the murder of almost 83,000 Dutch Jews (including Anne Frank) and sentenced to an additional 15 years in jail for deportation of Jews to Auschwitz and Sobibor. He was given credit for his prior time served as well as his pre-trial detention, leaving him with approximately six years to serve. He was granted early release in August 1968, which again caused a public outcry. The Ludwig-Maximilians-Universität München officially withdrew his doctorate. The Dutch Auschwitz Committee petitioned the Chancellor of Germany not to pardon him, but the pardon was approved in 1969. Harster died in 1991.

== SS and police ranks ==
SS and police ranks
Date	Rank
9 November 1933	SS-Anwärter
9 August 1934	SS-Mann
30 January 1936	SS-Rottenführer
20 April 1936	SS-Scharführer
20 April 1937	SS-Hauptscharführer
9 November 1937	SS-Untersturmführer
1 August 1938	SS-Obersturmbannführer
1 August 1940	SS-Standartenführer
1 January 1941	Oberst der Polizei
9 November 1941	SS-Oberführer
9 November 1942	SS-Brigadeführer und Generalmajor der Polizei
9 November 1944	SS-Gruppenführer und Generalleutnant der Polizei

== See also ==
- The Holocaust in Italy
- The Holocaust in the Netherlands
