= Lake Maggiore massacres =

1943 German massacre of Jews in Italy

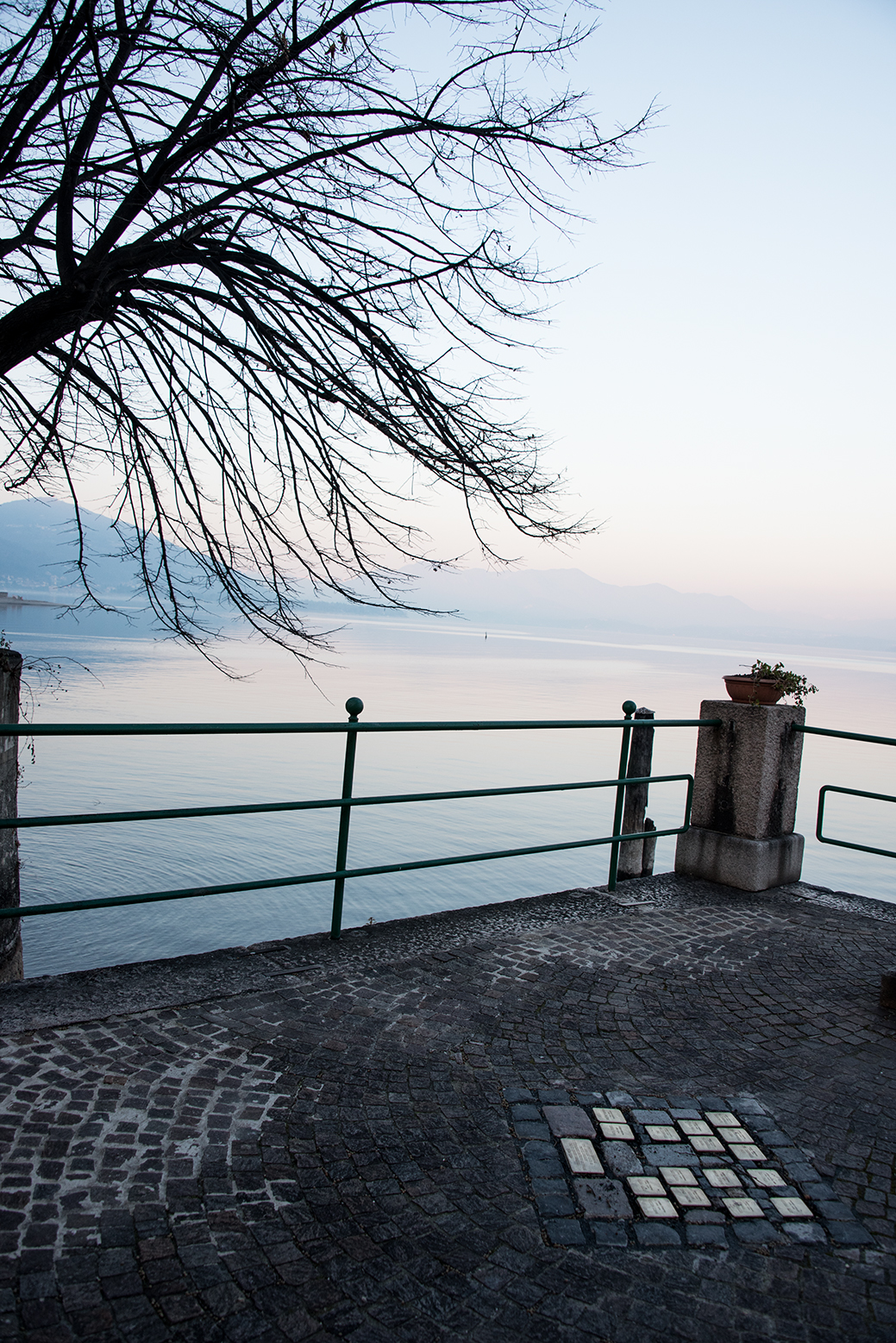
- Stolpersteine in Meina

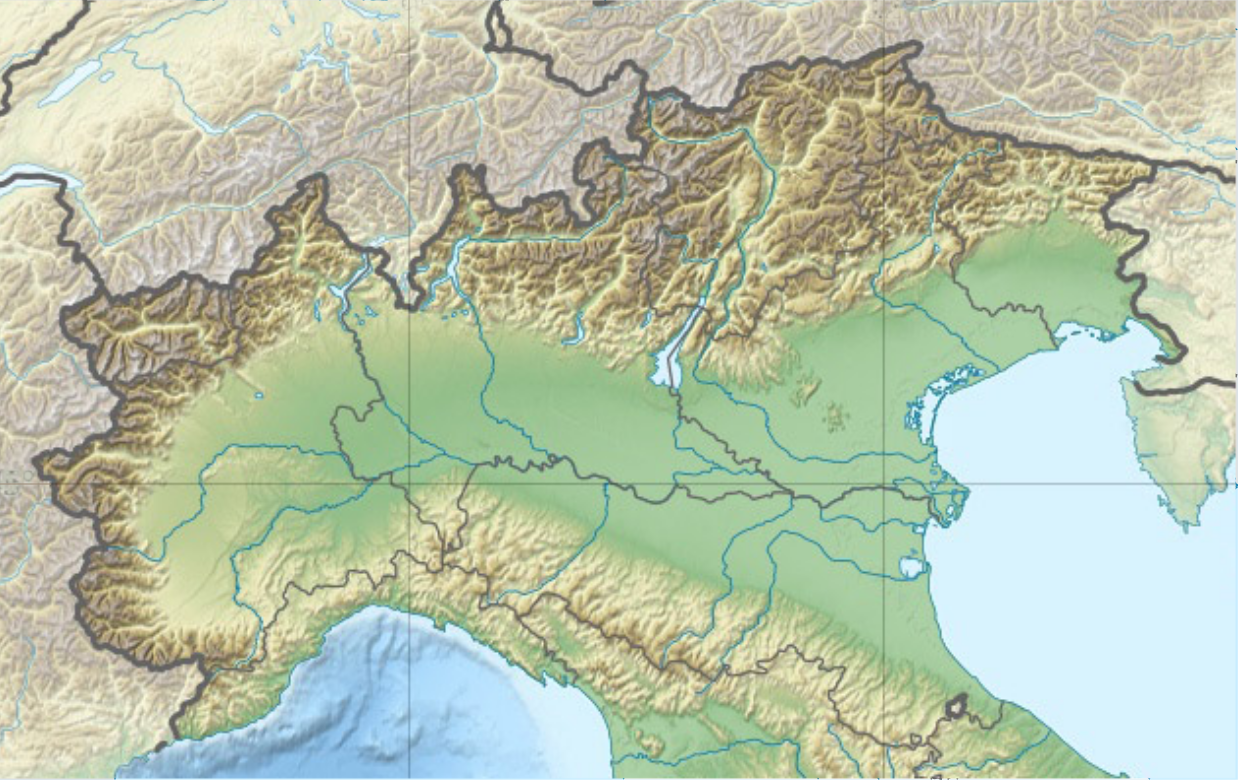
- Lake Maggiore massacres (Northern Italy)
- Location: 45°47′N 8°32′E; Lake Maggiore, Piedmont, Italy
- Date: September–October 1943
- Target: Italian Jews and Jewish refugees
- Attack type: Massacre
- Deaths: 56
- Perpetrator: Soldiers of the 1st SS Panzer Division
- Verdict: 1968: Three sentenced for life and two sentenced to three years in jail 1970: All sentences overturned and perpetrators released
- Convicted: Five members of the division

The Lake Maggiore massacres was a set of World War II war crimes that took place near Lake Maggiore, Italy in September and October 1943. Despite strict orders not to commit any violence against civilians in the aftermath of the Italian surrender on 8 September 1943, members of the SS Division Leibstandarte murdered 56 Jews, predominantly Italian and Greek. Many of the bodies were sunk into the lake to prevent discovery but one washed ashore in neighbouring Switzerland, drawing international attention to the massacre and prompting an inconclusive divisional inquiry. It is commonly referred to as the first German massacre of Jews in Italy during World War II.

The war crime was subject to a trial in West Germany in 1968 in which five of the accused were found guilty but later controversially released after a verdict by the German high court which ruled that the statute of limitations for the case had expired.

== Prelude ==
Following the Italian surrender on 8 September 1943 the 1st SS Panzer Division Leibstandarte SS Adolf Hitler was stationed in northern Italy, having recently returned from the Eastern Front. At this point the division had strict orders not to commit any violence against civilians. Despite this, a unit of the division under Joachim Peiper committed the Boves massacre on 19 September in retaliation to the capture of two German soldiers and murdered 23 civilians despite the release of the two soldiers.

Despite having no authorisation or orders to do so the division hunted down Jewish refugees attempting to escape the former Italian occupation zone in France who were trying to find safety in Italy. The division arrested and executed Jews and looted Jewish property and, eventually, was ordered to stop this practice by SS-corps commander Paul Hausser who had made it clear that the arrest of Jews and confiscation of their property was exclusively reserved for the security police and the Sicherheitsdienst (SD; Security Service).

== Massacres ==
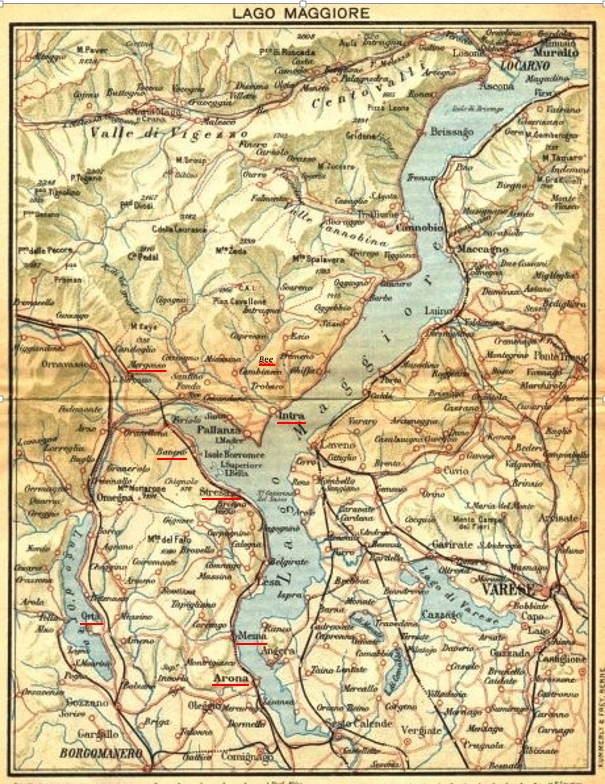
Map of Lake Maggiore from the 1930s with the locations of the massacres underlined red

Immediately after the Italian surrender a battalion of the Leibstandarte was stationed on the western side of Lake Maggiore to assist with the disarming of the Italian Army. A number of Jewish families lived in the villages on this side of the lake, some of them Jewish Greek refugees, others Italian Jews who had escaped the cities. Their identity and location was passed on to the Germans by local Italian Fascists.

Members of the division arrested over 50 of those and held them in a number of local hotels. The best-known of these massacres was that of the sixteen prisoners held at the Hotel Meina, at Meina. On 19 September the involved officers of the division held a meeting in which it was decided to shoot the Jewish men, women and children and to sink their bodies into the lake.

The Jewish prisoners were taken in small groups from their hotels at night on 22 and 23 September and taken to a local forest where they were shot. The bodies were then placed in sacks filled with stones, rowed out in boats and sunk in the lake.

A number of other Jewish prisoners were murdered and then buried in mass graves. Only very few of the prisoners escaped, with one family surviving because of their Turkish passports and assistance from the Turkish consul who arranged passage to Switzerland for them.

Apart from the sixteen murders at Meina on 22 and 23 September, fourteen Jews were killed at Baveno between 14 and 22 September, two at Pian Di Nava, near Premeno, on 15 September and nine at Arona, three at Mergozzo and two at Orta San Giulio on 16 September. The following day, 17 September, four Jews were killed at Stresa.

In October 1943, members of the same battalion murdered the Jewish banker Ettore Ovazza and three of his family members at Intra, near Verbania, also on the Lake Maggiore, and buried the bodies.

The exact number of victims varies, but at least 50 Greek and Italian Jews were murdered by the division in September and October 1943 during the Lake Maggiore massacres, and as many as 56 victims are stated in what has been described as the first German massacre of Jews in Italy during World War II.

== Aftermath ==
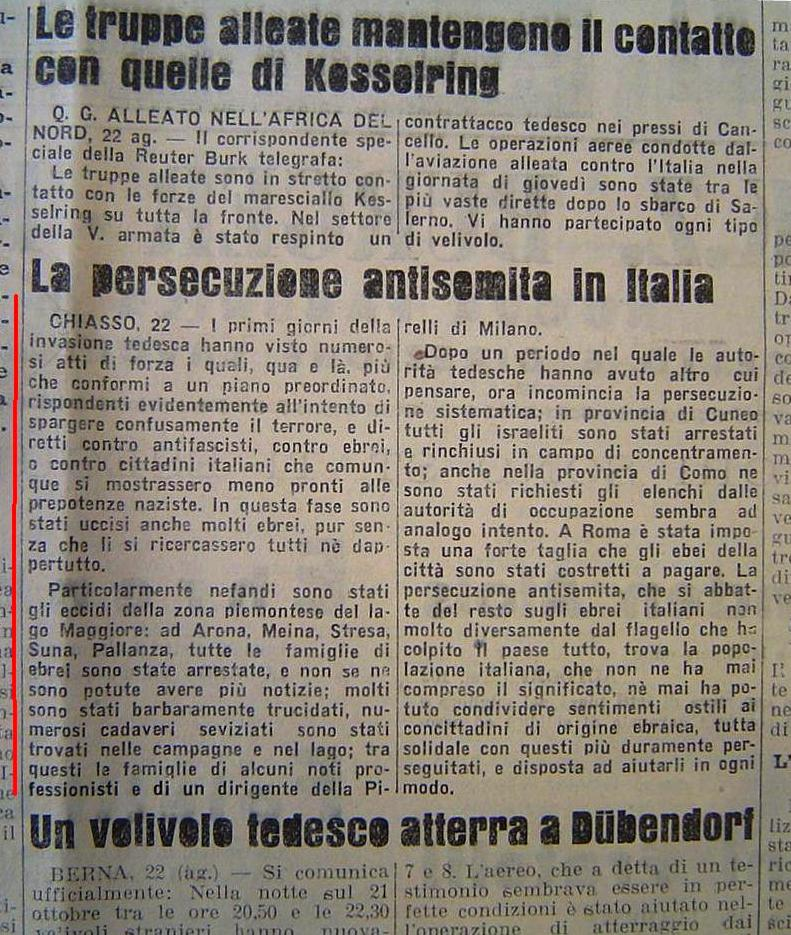
Swiss newspaper article on the events from 23 October 1943

The case received international attention after one of the bodies washed ashore in Switzerland and the case was reported in a local Swiss newspaper. This forced an investigation into the events by two judges of the Leibstandarte division. While members of the division were interviewed no outcome has been recorded and the division was soon moved back to the Eastern Front.

== Trials ==
Five members of the Leibstandarte, Hans Krüger, de:Herbert Schnelle, de:Hans Röhwer, Oskar Schultz and de:Ludwig Leithe, were charged by a court in Osnabrück in 1968 with 22 cases of murder., commanded by SS-Hauptsturmführer de:Friedrich Bremer.

The court found the first three guilty of murder and sentenced them for life while the other two received a jail sentence of three years as accessories in the crime. The case was taken to Germany's high court, the Bundesgerichtshof, which ruled that, while not overturning the guilty verdict, that the perpetrators had to be freed on a technicality. As the crime had been committed in 1943 and was investigated by the division already back then, also without a conclusion, the usual start date for the statute of limitations for Nazi crimes, the date of the German surrender in 1945, did not apply, meaning the 1943 massacre's statute of limitations had been expired.

This verdict caused much frustration in Germany with a younger generation of state prosecutors who were actually interested in prosecuting Nazi crimes and their perpetrators.

For the murder of the Ovazza family, Austrian SS-Obersturmführer de:Gottfried Meir was charged in 1954 in Klagenfurt but found not guilty. He was convicted in absentia by a military court in Turin in 1955 and sentenced for life but never extradited.

== In popular culture ==
The events and massacre at Hotel Meina were made into a movie in 2007. The movie sparked controversy as it deviated from the book source of the story, written by Marco Nozza, and also from the real events. It was accused for portraying the Germans in a positive light.

Becky Behar Ottolenghi, daughter of the hotel owner and an eyewitness to the events, thirteen years old at the time, published her memory of the events in a book titled The Forgotten Massacre.
