= Borgo San Dalmazzo concentration camp =

World War II German-run facility in Italy

Coordinates: 44°19′36″N 07°29′12″E

Borgo San Dalmazzo
- Transit camp
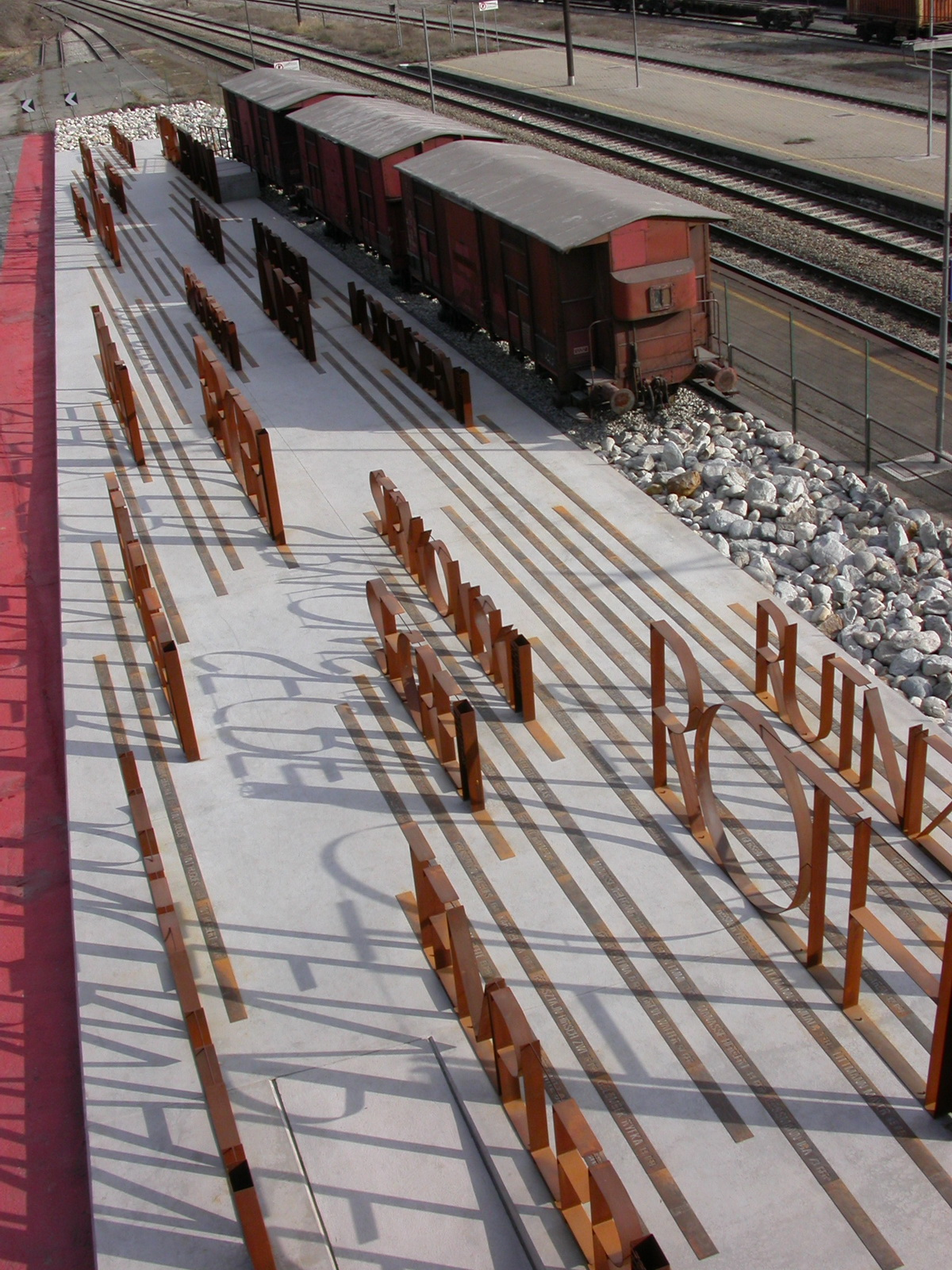
- Memorial of the deportation of the Jews in Borgo San Dalmazzo

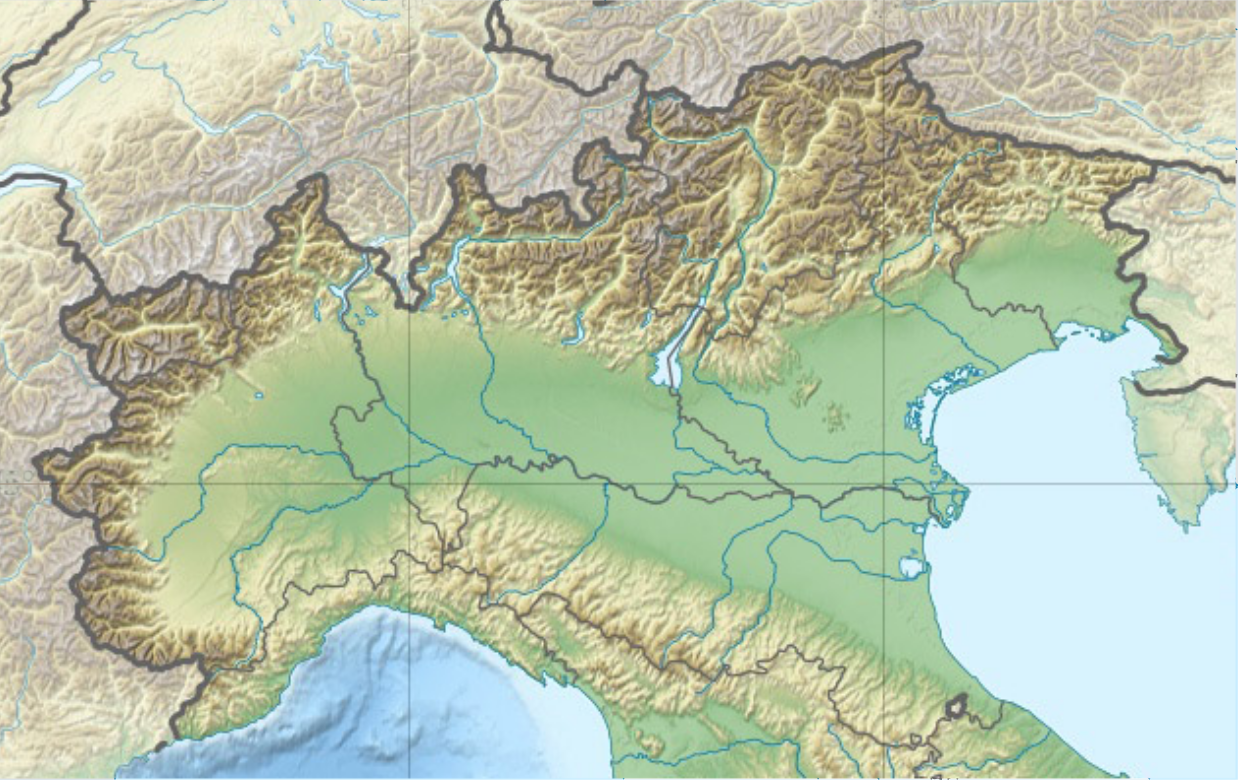
- Location within Northern Italy
- Other names: Polizeihaftlager Borgo San Dalmazzo
- Location: Borgo San Dalmazzo, Piedmont, Italy
- Operated by: Nazi Germany (1943) Italian Social Republic (1943–44)
- Original use: Military barracks
- Operational: 1943–1944
- Inmates: Jewish refugees
- Number of inmates: German period: 349 Italian period: 26

Borgo San Dalmazzo was an internment camp operated by Nazi Germany in Borgo San Dalmazzo, Piedmont, Italy.

The camp operated under German control from September to November 1943 and, following that, under the control of the Italian Social Republic from December 1943 to February 1944. Approximately 375 Jewish Italians and 349 refugees from other countries (119 from Poland as well as refugees from France, the Soviet Union, Germany, Austria, Romania, Hungary, Croatia and Greece), were held at Borgo San Dalmazzo until deported to Auschwitz and other German camps where all but a few were murdered.

== Camp history ==
=== German period ===
The camp was established on 18 September 1943, ten days after the surrender of Italy to the Allies, in a former Alpini barracks of the Royal Italian Army near the railway station of Borgo. Up to the Italian surrender, Jews of Italian nationality and refugees from other European nations had lived in relative safety in Italy and the parts of Southern France occupied by Italy. After the Italian surrender, German forces already in the country began an occupation and ordered all non-Italian nationals in the area to present themselves to the occupation authorities. With local assistance, a large number of the Jewish refugees managed to hide, but 349 people (201 men and 148 women) either presented to the authorities or were captured and moved to the Borgo San Dalmazzo concentration camp. Many were caught by the 1st SS Panzer Division while trying to cross the French border into Italy at Ventimiglia.

Conditions in the camp were far less severe than in other, similar camps, and medical assistance was available to the inmates at the hospitals of Borgo and, for more severe cases, Cuneo. Despite a number of successful escapes from the camp, conditions did not worsen much for the inmates. On 9 November 1943, most of the Jews of Italian nationality were released for reasons unknown. On 21 November, the 328 non-Italian Jews remaining in the camp were, on orders from the Gestapo office in Nice, taken to the nearby train station, put in freight cars, and taken to either Fossoli di Carpi or Drancy, France. These included the 41 inmates who were, at the time, recovering in the hospital of Borgo. Inmates who were at Cuneo hospital were protected and hidden by the hospital staff and were not removed.

Many of those saved from deportation were helped by a local Catholic priest, Don Raimondo Viale, who provided food, shelter and, eventually, an opportunity to escape to Switzerland. His efforts were honoured when he was named as one of the Righteous Among the Nations by Yad Vashem in August 2000.

In three stages, on 7 December, 17 December and 27 January, the prisoners at Fossoli di Carpi and Drancy were deported to Auschwitz concentration camp. It is estimated that no more than twelve of the people formerly kept at the camp survived to see liberation at the end of the war. Following the deportations of 21 November, the camp was shut down for a short period.

=== Italian period ===
The former German camp was taken over by the Cuneo Police Department a few days after its closure. Under German orders, the local authorities continued to arrest Jewish refugees in the area. A total of 26 people were arrested and held at the camp, mostly women. On 13 January 1944, these prisoners were sent to Fossoli di Carpi and were deported from there on 22 February 1944, mostly to Auschwitz. Following this final deportation, the Borgo San Dalmazzo concentration camp was permanently closed, although Jews continued to be arrested and executed in the area up to the end of the war. Jews captured after the closure were usually held in prison in Turin until deported via Fossoli di Carpi. Six Jewish refugees were found and captured in March and April 1945 were executed near Cuneo by soldiers of the Fascist Italian Black Brigades on 25 April 1945, shortly before the town was liberated by partisans.

== Victims ==
Of the approximately 375 inmates at Borgo, only a small number survived the Holocaust. Most were deported to Auschwitz where they were exterminated. A few were also sent to Buchenwald where they were also killed. The victims were refugees from Poland (119 persons), France, the Soviet Union, Germany, Austria, Romania, Hungary, Croatia and Greece. The Italian nationals held at Borgo were mostly released, although 23 Italians were also deported.

The names, ages and nationalities of the victims are well documented. There were slightly more male (209) than female (166) inmates. The victims included both the very young and the very old. There were 78 inmates under the age of 21 (with the youngest being less than a year old). There were 76 inmates over the age of 70.

It is estimated that only between 12 and 18 of the inmates survived the Holocaust, less than five per cent.

== Aftermath ==
No trace now remains of the former Borgo San Dalmazzo concentration camp, but two epitaphs were erected to mark the events that took place in Borgo San Dalmazzo. In 2006 a memorial was erected at the Borgo San Dalmazzo railway station to honor the victims of the deportations. The memorial contains the name, age and country of origin of each of the victims as well as those of the few survivors. Freight cars similar to those used in the deportation are preserved nearby.
