= Meina =

- Comune
- Comune di Meina
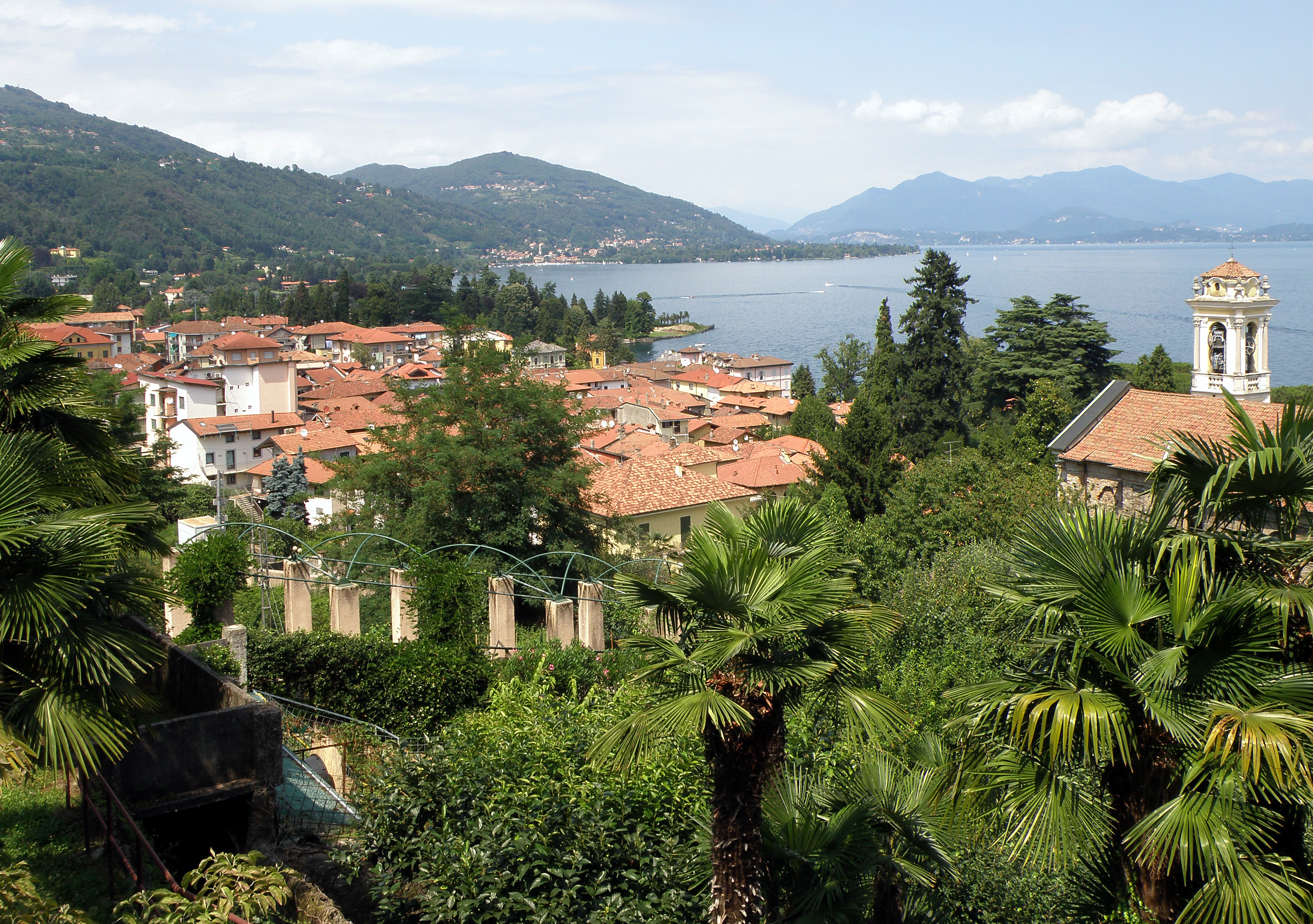
- Meina and Lake Maggiore.

- Coat of arms

- Location within Italy Location within Piedmont
- Coordinates: 45°47′N 8°32′E
- Country: Italy
- Region: Piedmont
- Province: Novara (NO)
- Frazioni: Ghevio, Silvera

Government
  - Mayor: Fabrizio Barbieri

Area
  - Total: 7.8 km^{2} (3.0 sq mi)
- Elevation: 214 m (702 ft)

Population (2007)
  - Total: 2,446
  - Density: 310/km^{2} (810/sq mi)
- Demonym: Meinesi
- Time zone: UTC+1 (CET)
  - Summer (DST): UTC+2 (CEST)
- Postal code: 28046
- Dialing code: 0322
- Patron saint: St. Margaret

Meina is a comune (municipality) in the Province of Novara in the Italian region of Piedmont, located about 77 kilometres (48 mi) northwest of Milan, about 100 kilometres (62 mi) northeast of Turin and about 40 kilometres (25 mi) north of Novara, on the southern area of Lake Maggiore.

Meina is often called the "village of villas" because of the many grand residences that dot the shoreline. Villa Eden is a neo-Palladian palace with Renaissance-inspired symmetry. Villa Faraggiana has an elegantly classical facade with formal gardens that form the foundation of the Museo Botanico. The Palazzo Municipale was built in the 1800s with various coloured local granite stones. It boasts beautiful ceiling frescoes in the Council Salon.

During World War II, Meina was the site of the massacre of 16 Italian Jews by German SS soldiers as part of the Lake Maggiore massacres. The event inspired the movie Hotel Meina, directed in 2007 by Carlo Lizzani.
