= Liana Millu =

Italian writer

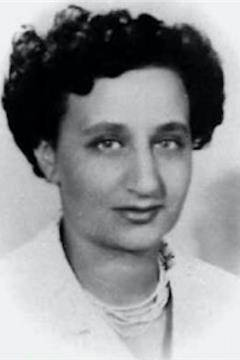
Liana Millu

Liana Millu (born Millul; 21 December 1914 – 6 February 2005) was a Jewish-Italian journalist, World War II resistance fighter and Holocaust survivor. She is best known for her 1947 autobiography Smoke over Birkenau, translated to English as Smoke over Birkenau.

== Biography ==
Millu was raised by her grandparents, and spent most of her life in Genoa. Her surname at birth was Millul, but she later changed it to Millu for her pseudonym. She worked as a journalist for Il Telegrafo and schoolteacher.

In 1943, Millu joined the Italian partisans. She was arrested in 1944 and deported to Auschwitz-Birkenau in Poland.

After the war, Millu returned to Italy and became an author. Her work is included in the Italian anthology, Twentieth-Century Ligurian Writers.

== Works ==
- Smoke over Birkenau (translated by novelist Lynne Sharon Schwartz, who won the 1991 PEN Renato Poggioli translation award; 1994) – ISBN 0-8101-1569-7
- The Bridges of Schwerin (novel), winner of the 1978 Viareggio Prize
- Josephia's Shirt (collection of stories)
- From Liguria to the Extermination Camps (non-fiction)

== See also ==
- Primo Levi
