= Congress of Verona (1943) =

Italian Republican Fascist Party meeting

The Congress of Verona in November 1943 was the only congress of the Italian Republican Fascist Party, the successor of the National Fascist Party. At the time, the Republican Fascist Party was nominally in charge of the Italian Social Republic, also called the Salò Republic, which was a fascist state set up in Northern Italy after the Italian government signed an armistice with the Allies and fled to Southern Italy. The Salò Republic was in fact a German puppet state and most of its internal and external policies were dictated by German military commanders. Nevertheless, Italian fascists were allowed to keep the trappings of sovereignty. It was under these conditions that they organized the Congress of Verona, ostensibly for the purpose of charting a new political course and rejuvenating the Italian fascist movement. The attitude of the Italian Fascists towards Italian Jews also drastically changed after the Congress of Verona, when Fascist authorities declared them to be of "enemy nationality" and began to actively participate in the prosecution and arrest of Jews.

== Proposals made at the Congress ==
The Congress produced several statements, proposals and decisions, most of which were never implemented due to the ongoing war and the German occupation. According to historian Peter Neville, the fascist delegates at the congress were well aware of their lack of any real political power, so they made intentionally unrealistic or dishonest promises, knowing that they would never have to carry them out. Significantly, Benito Mussolini, the founder and leader of Italian Fascism, was not present at the congress. He only sent a letter to the delegates, which was read as part of the opening ceremony.

Of the decisions made at the Congress of Verona, the most important, which made the greatest practical impact, was the transformation of Italian fascism into a republican movement, after it had supported the monarchy of King Victor Emmanuel III for 21 years. The decision was motivated by the fact that the king had arrested Mussolini and made peace with the Allies just months before the congress; in fact, it was that action that forced the fascists to flee to Northern Italy and try to set up a new state there. The king was, therefore, a traitor in their eyes.

The Congress of Verona also made a series of sweeping promises that represented an almost total departure from previous fascist policy. It promised to introduce a democratic government elected on the basis of popular sovereignty, to convene a Constituent Assembly that would draft a new constitution, to allow freedom of the press, to create an independent judiciary that would investigate corruption and abuses under the previous fascist government, to hand over uncultivated land to poor farmers, to bring some key industries under state ownership and to institute profit sharing in many other private industries. These latter economic policies were meant to represent a "Third Position" between capitalist plutocracy and Marxist socialism.

However, none of the promises made at Verona were kept. The head of state remained unelected, the Constituent Assembly never met, free speech continued to be restricted as before, and a Special Tribunal was set up to convict enemies of fascism rather than investigate government corruption. The proposed "third way" also failed to materialize. In key industries private shareholders still played a central role, workers' rights were severely limited, and trade unions had no power.

Similar statements and proclamations continued to be made over the following year, always without practical consequences. On February 12, 1944, Mussolini's cabinet approved a bill of "socialization" that spoke about the "Mussolinian conception on subjects such as; much higher social justice, a more equitable distribution of wealth and the participation of labor in the state life." Mussolini claimed that Italian capitalists had betrayed him after they had gained immensely from fascism, and that he now regretted his alliance with them and rediscovered his old socialist influences. He claimed that he had intended to carry out a large-scale nationalization of property in 1939–1940 but that the outbreak of war had forced him to postpone it, and promised that in the future, all industrial firms with over 100 employees would be nationalized. Mussolini even reached out to ex-communist Nicola Bombacci, a former student of Vladimir Lenin, to help him in spreading the image that Fascism was a progressive movement. However, no plans for nationalization were ever implemented.

Historians disagree about the purpose of the promises made at Verona. One theory is that the Republican Fascist Party was intentionally trying to show confusion about its policies and objectives; by then, there was a strong backlash in central and southern Italy against anything associated with fascism, and the fascists in the north could try to direct popular anger in the south against an idea or policy merely by associating themselves with that idea or policy. Historian Denis Mack Smith claimed that Mussolini was largely motivated by a desire for revenge against the Italian bourgeoisie, whom he perceived as having betrayed him. Smith also suggests that the policies were meant to make it difficult for foreign powers to occupy Italy if they lost the war, in what Mussolini termed a "social minefield" in his letters. Historian Peter Neville argued that the Congress of Verona was "largely window dressing", as the economic policies were disliked by the Nazi German occupiers who wanted to exploit Italian industry, and therefore impossible to implement. Neville also agrees with Smith that Mussolini intended to cause problems in an Allied-occupied Italy.

== Manifesto of Verona ==
The Manifesto of Verona (Italian: Manifesto di Verona) was an 18-point document that outlined the future policies of the Italian Social Republic, the RSI. The document was an attempt of return to radicalism of the early Fascism period and, at the same time, to placate Nazi Germany, who now were in total political control of the RSI. It reaffirmed Italy's commitment to its German and Japanese allies. Apart from promising internal political changes and liberties the manifesto outlined the following key points:

- Point 1: Abolition of the monarchy and proclamation of the social republic. Denunciation of the last "treasonous and fugitive king".
- Point 6: Roman Catholicism was declared as state religion but other religions are tolerated.
- Point 7: The members of the Jewish race are foreigners. During the current war they are considered of enemy nationality.
- Point 18: Continuation of the war in order to defeat the Allies and defend Italy's territorial gains.

Point seven drastically changed the status of the Jews of Italy. Having enjoyed a status of protection in Italy compared to areas controlled by Nazi Germany they were now actively persecuted, arrested and deported to concentration camps with the help of the Fascist Italian police. This prosecution by Italian authorities was not intended to extend to people who descended of mixed marriages.

== Sources ==
- Neville, Peter (2003). Mussolini. Routledge Historical Biographies. ISBN 9780415249904.
- Gentile, Carlo (October 2005). The Police Transit Camps in Fossoli and Bolzano - Historical report in connection with the trial of Manfred Seifert. Cologne: Author.
