= San Bernardino Realino, Carpi =

Church building in Carpi, Italy

Coordinates: 44°46′39.9″N 10°53′23.9″E

San Bernardino Realino is a 20th-century, Roman Catholic parish church located on Via Alghisi in Carpi, region of Emilia Romagna, Italy. There is a distinct church dedicated to San Bernardino da Siena in Carpi.

== History ==
The parish church is dedicated to St Bernardino Realino (1530–1616). Realino was born in Carpi, but his relics are now venerated in Lecce, where he died. He was canonized in 1947 by Pope Pius XII. The church building was erected in 1952.
