= Galasso =

Galasso (/ɡəˈlæsoʊ/) is both an Italian surname and a masculine Italian given name. Notable people with the name include:

== Surname ==
- Alessio Galasso (born 1974), French rugby union player
- Andrea Galasso (1932–2022), Italian politician
- Bob Galasso (born 1952), American baseball player
- Frankie J. Galasso (born 1985), American musician and actor
- Gianluca Galasso (born 1984), Italian footballer
- Giuseppe Galasso (1929–2018), Italian historian and politician
- Latino Galasso (1898–1949), Italian rower
- Michael Galasso (1949–2009), American composer, violinist and music director
- Norberto Galasso (born 1936), Argentine historian and writer
- Pasquale Galasso (born 1955), Italian Camorra Boss
- Pedro Galasso (1930–2007), Brazilian boxer
- Vincenzo Galasso, Italian economics professor

== Given name ==
- Galasso Alghisi (1523–1573), Italian Renaissance architect and writer
- Galasso Galassi, Italian Renaissance painter
- Galasso I Pio (died 1367), lord of Carpi, Italy
