= Giovanni Gavignani =

Italian painter

Giovanni Gavignani (1614/1615-1676) was an Italian painter and stucco artist active in his native Carpi.

== Biography ==
He learned painting from Guido dal Conte and stucco decoration from Annibale Grissoni. He is known for decorating two altars in the church of San Niccolo in Carpi: the altar of St Antony of Padua (1652) and the altar of the Annunciation (1670s). He also completed works for the Duomo of Carpi. Among his pupils were the stucco artist Giovanni Matteo Barzelli, Pietro Deboli, and Simone Setti; all active in stucco-work and scagliola.
