= Zeno Saltini =

Italian Roman Catholic priest and founder of the Nomadelfia movement

Servant of God Zeno Saltini
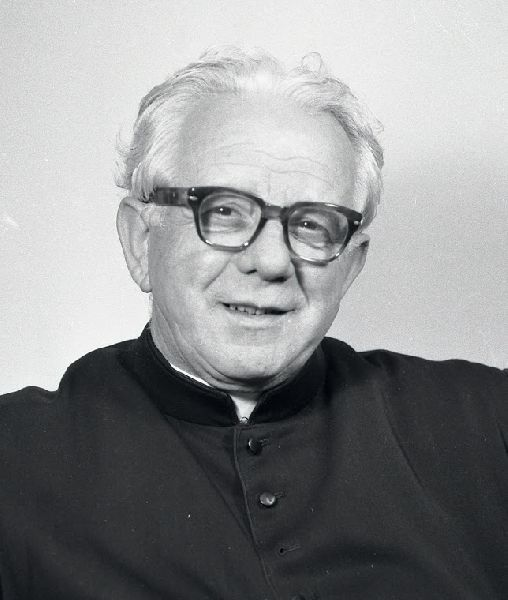
- Saltini in 1963
- Born: 30 August 1900; Fossoli, Carpi, Modena, Kingdom of Italy
- Died: 15 January 1981 (aged 80); Grosseto, Italy

Zeno Saltini (30 August 1900 – 15 January 1981) was an Italian Roman Catholic priest and the founder of the Nomadelfia movement. He also had set up a war orphans refuge at the old Fossoli di Carpi concentration camp in the Emilia-Romagna region but this was closed in 1952 after ecclesial authorities ordered his departure and the camp's closure. The movement moved to Grosseto after a countess donated land to them to use and Saltini's communal group flourished and grew in numbers despite the Church's severe reservations regarding Saltini's work.

This friction led in 1953 to him leaving the priesthood, although he was later restored in 1962. Future outlooks on Nomadelfia mellowed over time and even earned papal support from Pope John Paul II towards the end of Saltini's life. His beatification process opened in 2009 after the Tuscan Episcopal Conference issued their assent to the cause's launch; a formal edict issued within the next fortnight launched the cause in Grosseto.

== Life ==
=== Childhood to education ===
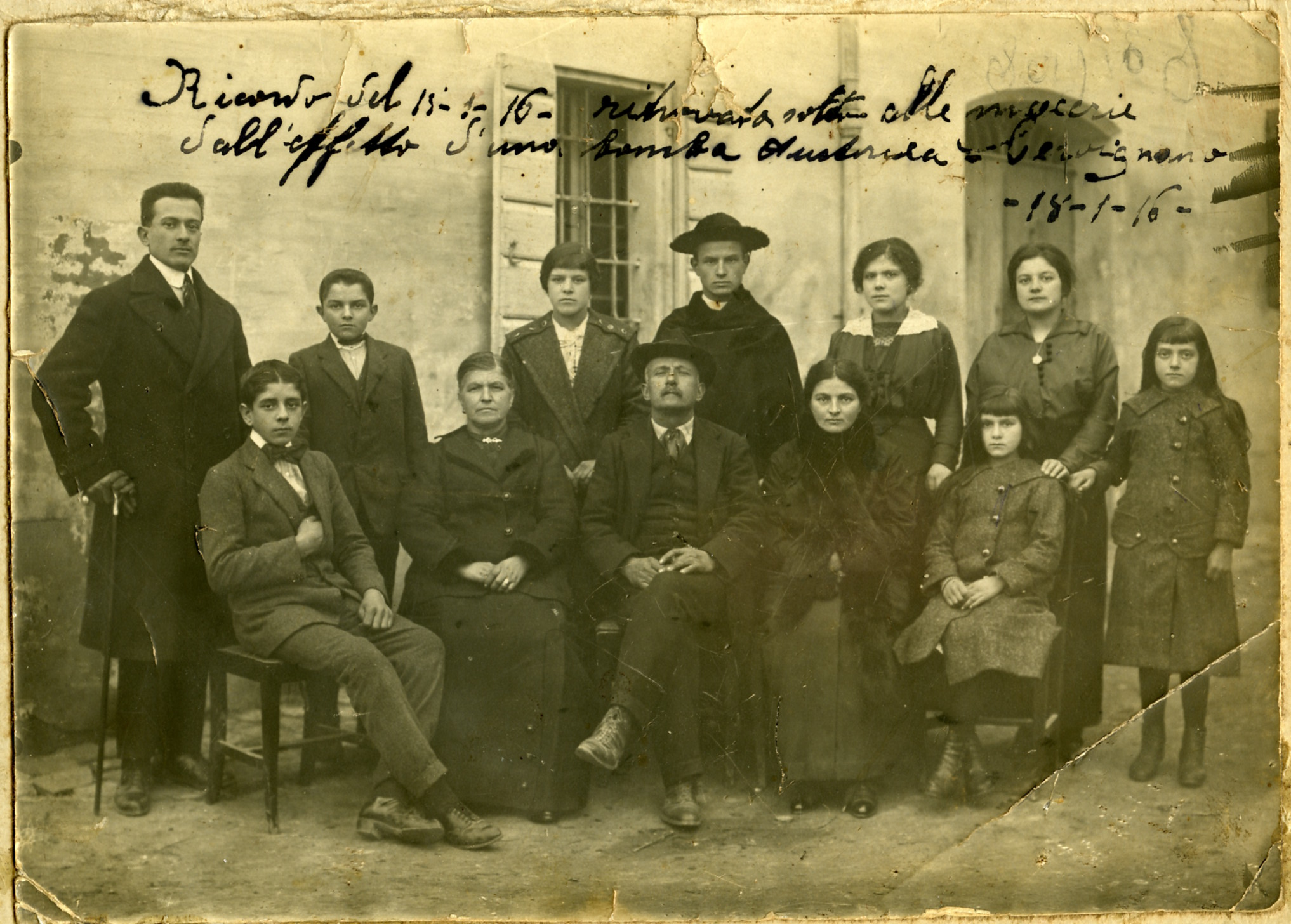
The Saltini's in a photograph dated 18 January 1916

Zeno Saltini was born in Fossoli in 1900 as the ninth of twelve children to the rich landowners Cesare Saltini and Filomena Rigi. His older sister was Maria Anna Saltini Testi, who founded a religious order and later was proclaimed as venerable. Three of his brothers would later enter the religious life. In 1914, he decided to cease his studies and refused to return to school because he believed that he had learnt subjects of little relevance to life. He therefore started to work on his parents' land and soon became acquainted with the miseries and the aspirations of fellow farmworkers and landowners. This proved to later be the basis for his life going forward.

He later was conscripted into the national service in 1917 during World War I and was posted in Florence. In 1920 he had a profound encounter with an anarchist (also a fellow soldier whom he knew) who in the presence of other soldiers sustained that Jesus Christ and the Church were little more than obstacles to human progress moving forward. Saltini attempted to sustain the complete opposite but realized his educated opponent had the support of most of the gathered soldiers so decided to retreat from the debate before it worsened. This incident humiliated Saltini who locked himself in a room and wept. He reflected upon this encounter and declared: "I want to be neither a servant nor a master" in the aim that he would change civilization beginning with himself.

From that point on he decided to resume his studies and entered into a law course at the college in Milan where he also continued to participate in apostolic activities such as working alongside Azione Cattolica. Saltini also ended up in Verona at some stage alongside the priest Saint Giovanni Calabria whom he befriended while he also got to know the Bishop of Carpi Giovanni Pranzini. He completed his degree in 1929 and set himself on new work in which he aimed to aid those people who were unable to afford adequate legal services. But this too challenged Saltini who soon began to realize his true mission in life was to prevent people from falling into misfortune. He therefore decided to become a priest in 1930. Saltini returned to his alma mater where he underwent theological studies; both Calabria and Pranzini encouraged Saltini in his vocation and aspirations. He received his ordination to the priesthood on 4 January 1931 in the Carpi Cathedral from Bishop Pranzini. He celebrated his first Mass on 6 January at the Carpi Cathedral and at that Mass took Danilo (aged seventeen) as his spiritual son (Danilo had just been released from prison and had nowhere to go). That child served Saltini at the Mass as his altar server.

=== Priesthood ===
Saltini's first pastoral assignment was as a vice-parish priest in San Giacomo Roncole near Mirandola. It was there that he started to understand the importance of the cinema as a medium for promoting the Christian message and so opened a cinema there for the people. In 1941 he started to welcome abandoned children as his own and to that end founded the "Little Apostles" movement in order to care for poor and abandoned children. He also swore that he would never open a college. In 1941 a teenage girl named Irene Bertoni (aged eighteen) ran from home and asked Saltini if she could become the 'mother' of the Little Apostles. He conferred with and received approval from his bishop which allowed for Saltini to entrust the children to her care. It was not long before other women (the first being Maria Luisa Amadei) joined Irene and became known as the "mothers of vocation". In addition other priests joined Saltini and lived together as communitarian priests.

He was a staunch anti-Fascist who opposed their racial laws in the lead up to and during World War II. Saltini found a kindred spirit in the new Bishop of Carpi (and Capuchin friar) Vigilio Federico Dalla Zuanna who was supportive of Saltini's work. Upon Benito Mussolini's dismissal the Carabinieri arrested Saltino for spreading religious leaflets though released him after a few hours in fear of a popular uprising. It was following the armistice in 1943 that he travelled south with some of his children following him in order to escape arrest or potential deportation. He travelled first through Fossacesia in Chieti and then through Rome (where he spent a great deal of time) and then through to Campania. But back in San Giacomo Roncole were those who disliked Saltini and his work and attempted to ensure its dissolution. Some of Saltini's children joined partisan organizations and some of the communitarian priests collaborated with the Italian Resistance to help Jews flee to neutral Switzerland with false identification papers. But the cost proved high to Saltini who learned that seven of the Little Apostles had died. Upon the conflict's end he occupied in May 1947 the ex-concentration camp of Fossoli di Carpi (near Saltini's birthplace) and tore down its walls and fences in order to make a new town. Their constitution was adopted on 14 February 1948 and the group was renamed as Nomadelfia which in Greek meant "the law of brotherhood".

=== Nomadelfia ===
In 1950 Nomadelfia proposed a political movement called "movement for brotherhood" in order to abolish democratic abuses and maintain ideals central to the democratic concept but political and some ecclesial forces blocked this initiative. In addition the worsening economic condition in the region became more difficult to manage with homeless and abandoned people increasing and with some capitalizing upon this as an excuse to dissolve Nomadelfia.

Friction between Saltini and the Church grew in August 1951 when seven friars from the Servites (including Giovanni Vannucci) were commanded to return to their convents after it was found the friars were living among the Nomadelfians. On 5 February 1952 the Holy Office under the leadership of Cardinal Giuseppe Pizzardo - through the apostolic nuncio Francesco Borgongini Duca - ordered Saltini to leave Fossoli di Carpi and he did so in obedience with the camp being dissolved. Due to being forced out of the camp the movement sought shelter in Grosseto on 400 hectares of land that the Countess Maria Giovanna Albertoni Pirelli had donated to them since she was supportive to Saltini's vision. In 1951 he issued a book scathing in its nature: he proposed urgent Church reform and the unmasking of Marxism and Liberalism exploiting the poor which ran counter to the mission of the Church. In May 1952 the Cardinal Archbishop of Milan Alfredo Ildefonso Schuster published a notification that declared his disapproval for Saltini and his Nomadelfia movement. It was soon after this that accusations of fraud were levelled against Nomadelfia but in November 1952 a court in Bologna absolved the movement of the accusations proven to be false and unsubstantiated.

=== Exit and return to the priesthood ===
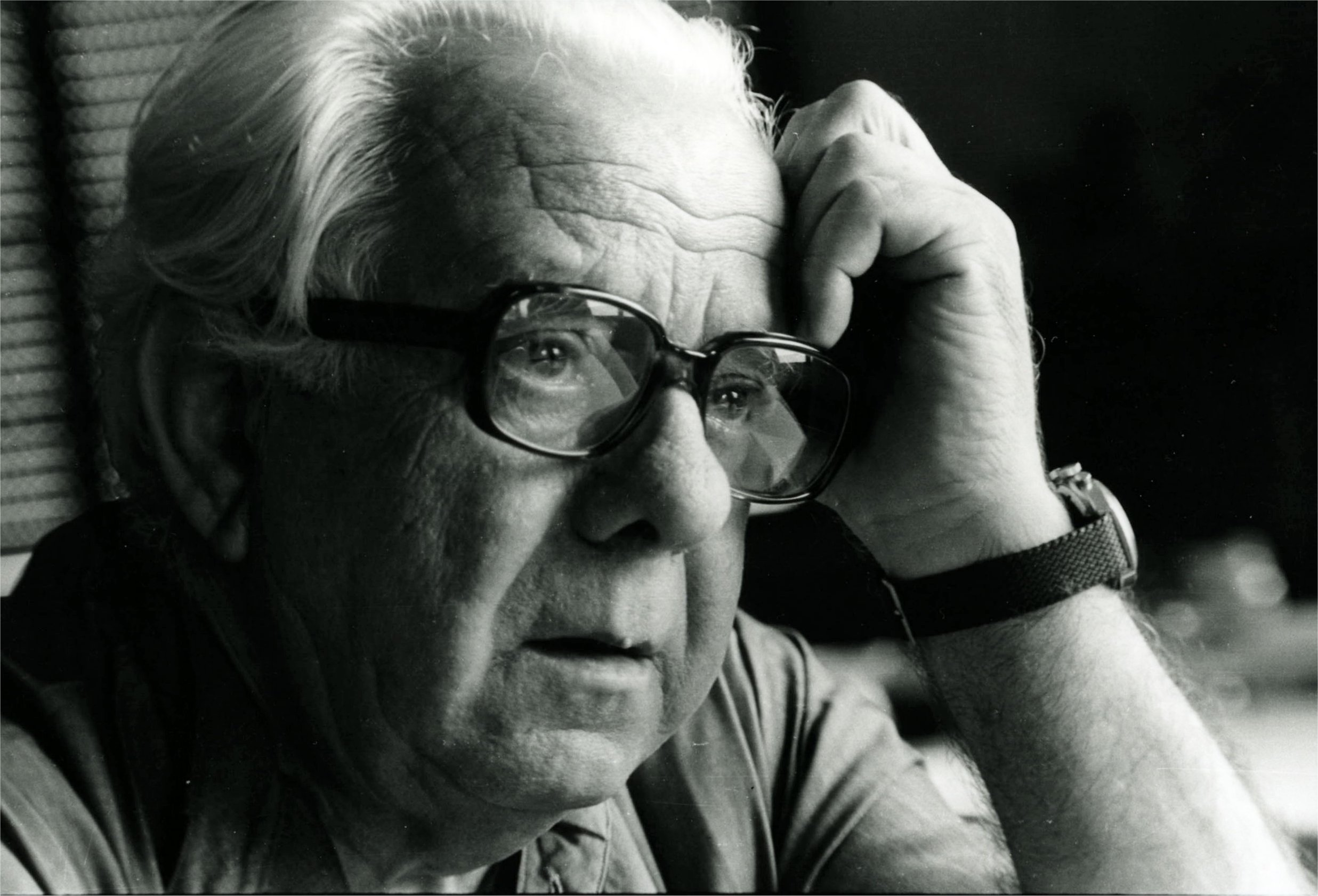
Saltini in 1974

In November 1953 he requested papal permission to leave the priesthood in order to return to the group that he had been forbidden to go back to which then led to Pope Pius XII granting him the secularization "pro gratia" that 30 November. It was at this stage in 1953 that Nomadelfia had around 400 members.

In 1961 Nomadelfia became a civil association and to that end drew up a new constitution. Pope John XXIII restored Saltini to the priesthood on 6 January 1962 (upon a personal request from the Cardinal Archbishop of Milan Giovanni Battista Montini) and he celebrated his "second" first Mass on 22 January. On 1 April 1962, Bishop of Grosseto Paolo Galeazzi established the parish of the Assumption of St. Mary in Nomadelfia, and Saltini was appointed as its parish priest. In 1965, he proposed a new form of apostolate known as the Nomadelfian Entertainment Evenings which consisted of a dance. Further to this was the publication in 1968 of the "Nomadelfia is a Proposal" magazine issued once a month. On 12 August 1980, the Nomadelfians performed for Pope John Paul II in Castel Gandolfo and the pope later remarked: "If we are called to be the sons of God and brothers, then Nomadelfia is a presage of the world to come."

Saltini died in 1981 in Grosseto due to a heart attack and his remains are buried at the Chiesa Comunitaria di Nomadelfia.

== Beatification process ==
On 30–31 March 2009, the Tuscan Episcopal Conference met and provided their assent to launching the beatification cause for the late Saltini; the cause opened a month after on 9 April 2009 after the then-Bishop of Grosseto Franco Agostinelli issued an edict assenting to the cause being launched in Grosseto.

== See also ==
- Streetwise priest
