= Marco Meloni =

Italian painter

Marco Meloni (Active 15th-16th centuries) was an Italian painter during the Renaissance period. He was born in Carpi, Emilia-Romagna, but was mainly active in and around Modena. He was a follower of Bianchi Ferrari and Francesco Francia.

Tiraboschi mentions that he is also known as il Meloncino or il Carpigianino. He painted a number of canvases for the church of San Bernardino da Siena, Carpi, including an Enthroned Madonna and Child with John the Baptist, and Saints Bernardino of Siena, Jerome, Francis, and Angels (1505).
