= San Bernardino da Siena =

San Bernardino da Siena may refer to:

- Bernardino of Siena, Italian priest and Franciscan missionary preacher
- San Bernardino da Siena, Carpi, Roman Catholic, Baroque style church in Carpi, Emilia-Romagna, Italy
- San Bernardino de Siena Church, Xochimilco, parish church of the borough of Xochimilco in Mexico City.
