= Santa Chiara, Carpi =

Church in Carpi, Italy

Santa Chiara and the adjacent monastery are a Roman Catholic church and Poor Clares nunnery respectively, located on Corso M. Fanti 79 in central Carpi, Emilia-Romagna, Italy.

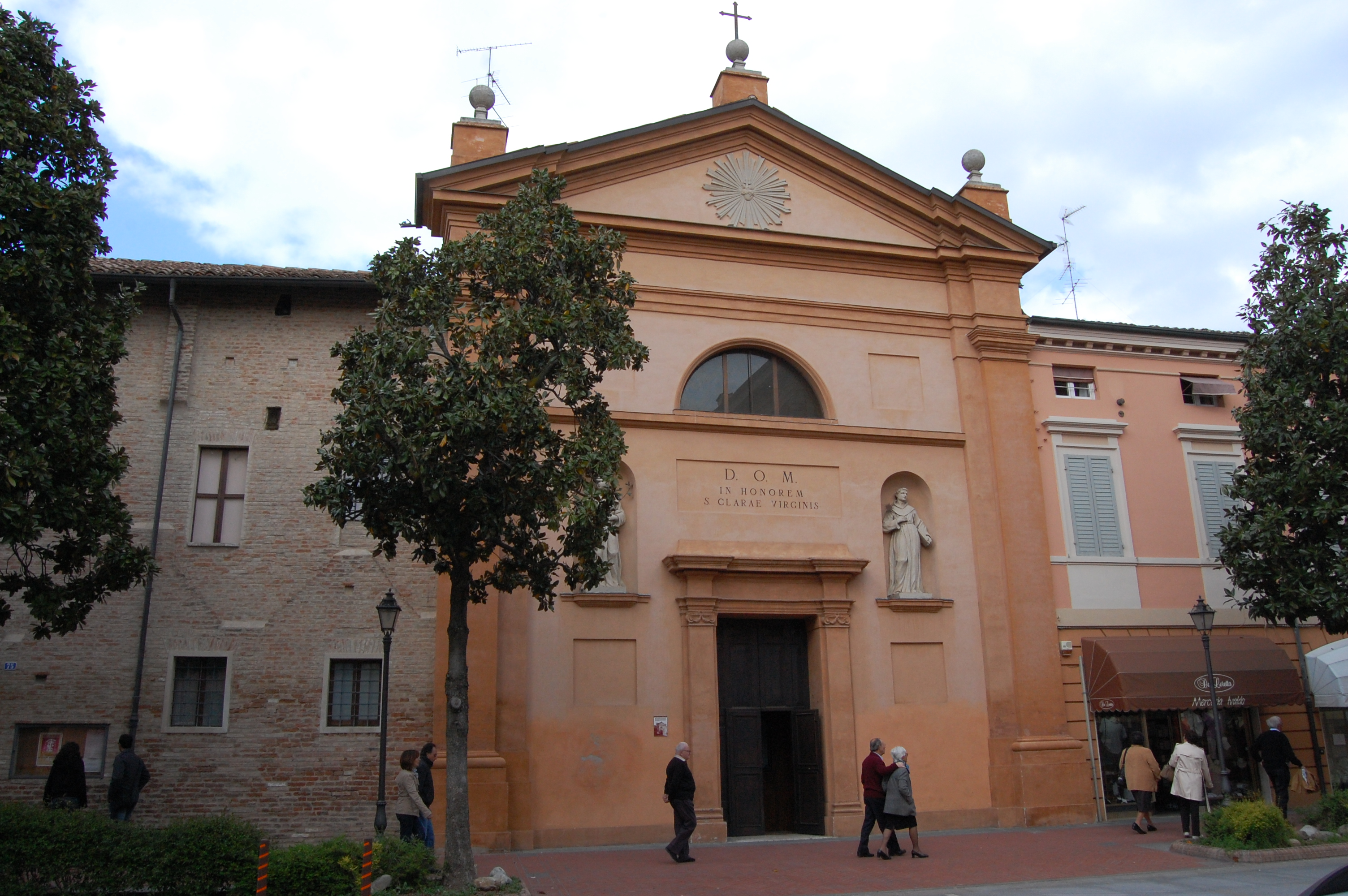
Facade of church and flanking monastery.

== History ==
The monastery was founded in 1490 by Camilla Pio di Savoia, born to a noble family of Carpi, who became a nun in 1500 and died four years later. Her incorrupt remains are exposed in the church. In the 17th century, one abbess was Eleonora, sister of the Cesare d'Este, Duke of Modena. The monastery is said to have been afflicted in the 17th century by an episode of group demonic possession.

The church underwent reconstruction in a Neoclassical style in 1845, although the interiors maintain the Renaissance architecture layout. The facade has a simple layout with two statues in niches. The church contains works by Luigi Asioli, and a Nativity by Giulio and Giacomo Francia and a Madonna of Soriano (1639) by Giovanni Maria Botalla. The main altar is a work of scagliola by Giovanni Massa.

The structure was damaged by the 2012 Northern Italy earthquakes, and reopened later that year.
