= Bernardino Realino =

Italian Roman Catholic saint

Saint Bernardino Realino S.J.
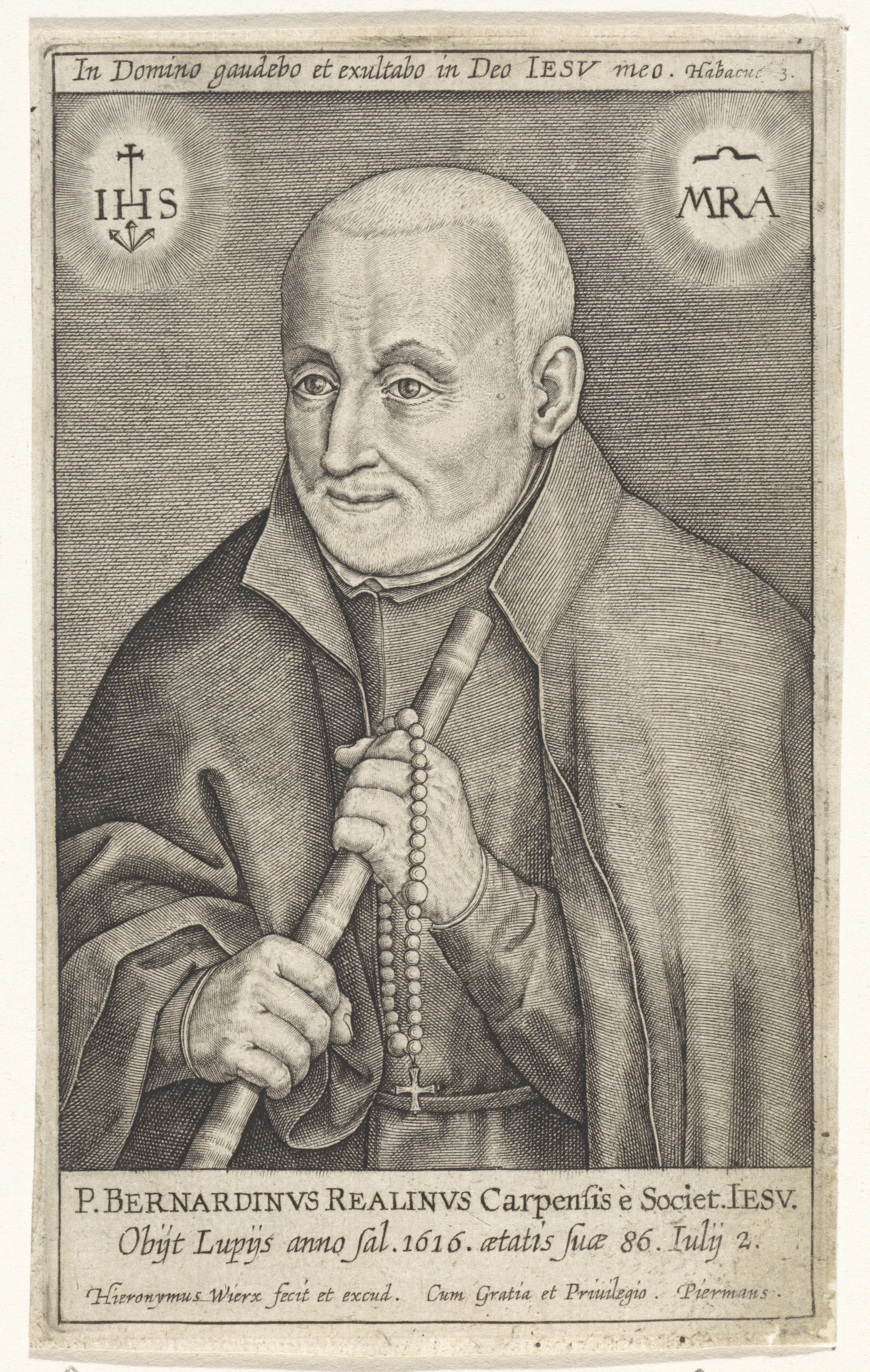

Priest
- Born: 1 December 1530; Carpi, Modena, Duchy of Modena and Reggio
- Died: 2 July 1616 (aged 85); Lecce, Kingdom of Naples
- Venerated in: Catholic Church
- Beatified: 12 January 1896, Saint Peter's Basilica, Kingdom of Italy by Pope Leo XIII
- Canonized: 22 June 1947, Saint Peter's Basilica, Vatican City by Pope Pius XII
- Feast: 2 July
- Attributes: Priest's cassock
- Patronage: Lecce

Bernardino Realino (1 December 1530 – 2 July 1616) was an Italian Roman Catholic priest and a professed member of the Jesuits. His entire career was devoted to the areas of Naples and Lecce. Realino pursued a career in law and served in several municipal capacities before feeling called to the Jesuit life and being ordained to the priesthood in Naples. He is often dubbed as the "Apostle of Lecce" for his commitment to the poor and for his preaching abilities.

Realino received beatification in 1896 from Pope Leo XIII while Pope Pius XII canonized him on 22 June 1947 as a saint of the Catholic Church.

== Life ==
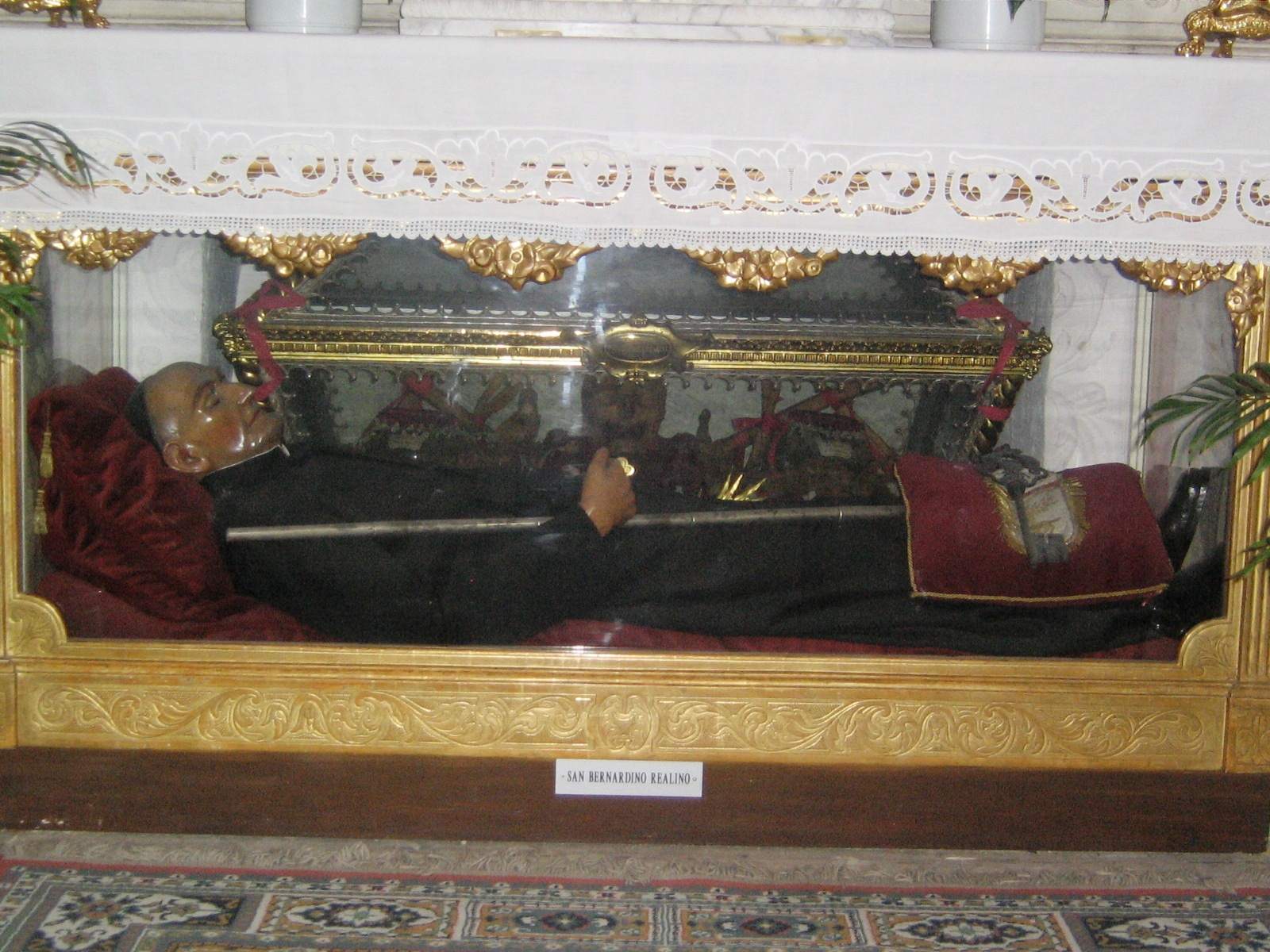
Tomb of Saint Bernardino Realino in Lecce.

Bernardino Realino was born in Carpi on 1 December 1530 to nobles. His father was a collaborator of Cardinal Cristoforo Madruzzo.

He first attended school at Modena. Realino began his studies in philosophy and medicine in Bologna but altered this midcourse to law; it was said that a woman he fell in love with persuaded him to do so on the assumption that Realino would be good at practising law. It also offered greater opportunities for advancement and wealth. He graduated with a doctorate in law – both civil and canon law – at the Bologna college in 1556. Through his family's influence, in 1556 he was appointed as the podestà of both the Cassine and Felizzano cities – he served as a judge in Felizzano. Realino was viewed as honest and became the praetor of Castelleone; he also worked as the chief tax collector in Alessandria. Realino became noted in these places for his legal brilliance and learning. He entered the service of Francesco Ferdinando d'Avalos and moved to Naples to act as the superintendent of the fiefs of the Marquis.

In Naples a Jesuit preacher's sermon so moved him that he sought out the priest and had him hear his confession; the priest noted his inclination to the religious life and – with some other Jesuit priests – invited him in August 1564 to make a week-long spiritual retreat with them, to discern his call. He joined the Jesuits on 13 October 1564 (Alfonso Salmeron welcomed him into the order) and began his period of the novitiate. Realino was ordained to the priesthood on 24 May 1567; he made his vows in October 1566. Francis Borgia appointed Realino as the novice master at Naples. He was later sent to found a Jesuit house and college in Lecce in 1574. In 1583 he began a movement for diocesan priests to foster their virtues and to improve their moral-theological education to make them better confessors and preachers. Realino spent most of his life going from place to place preaching parish missions. He taught catechism and visited slaves on the galleys in the harbour at Naples.

In 1610 he suffered a fall and sustained two wounds that never healed. Not long before his death blood was taken from one leg wound and placed in glass vials; his health took a sharp decline in June 1616. Following his death in mid-1616 the relics of his blood which were kept were reported to have liquified. On his deathbed, the Lecce magistrates asked him twice that he be the town's patron when he entered Heaven. Realino could not speak but nodded in approval and died whispering: "Gesù ... Maria". The blood was liquefied until the mid 19th century, though later instances were also reported.

Roberto Bellarmino heard of his death and said: "I have never heard a complaint about Father Realino though I have been his provincial; even those who were ill-disposed to the society who seized every opportunity to speak unfavourably of it always made an exception for Realino. ...Everyone knows that he is a saint".

== Sainthood ==
Realino was proclaimed to be Venerable on 31 July 1838 after Pope Gregory XVI confirmed his life of heroic virtue. Pope Leo XIII beatified the Jesuit priest in Saint Peter's Basilica on 12 January 1896 (after the confirmation of two miracles attributed to him) and a decree for the resumption of the cause was issued on 1 May 1902; an informative process for two additional miracles was held and it received validation from the Congregation for Rites on 29 February 1940, while a preparatory committee approved them on 1 April 1941. Pope Pius XII later canonized him as a saint (after the confirmation of two more miracles) on 22 June 1947.

Pius XII named him as the patron saint for Lecce on 15 December 1947.

His remains are preserved in Lecce in the Chiesa del Gesù.

== Sources ==
- Attwater, Donald and Catherine Rachel John. The Penguin Dictionary of Saints. 3rd edition. New York: Penguin Books, 1993. ISBN 0-14-051312-4.
