= Verona–Mantua–Modena railway =

Verona–Mantua–Modena
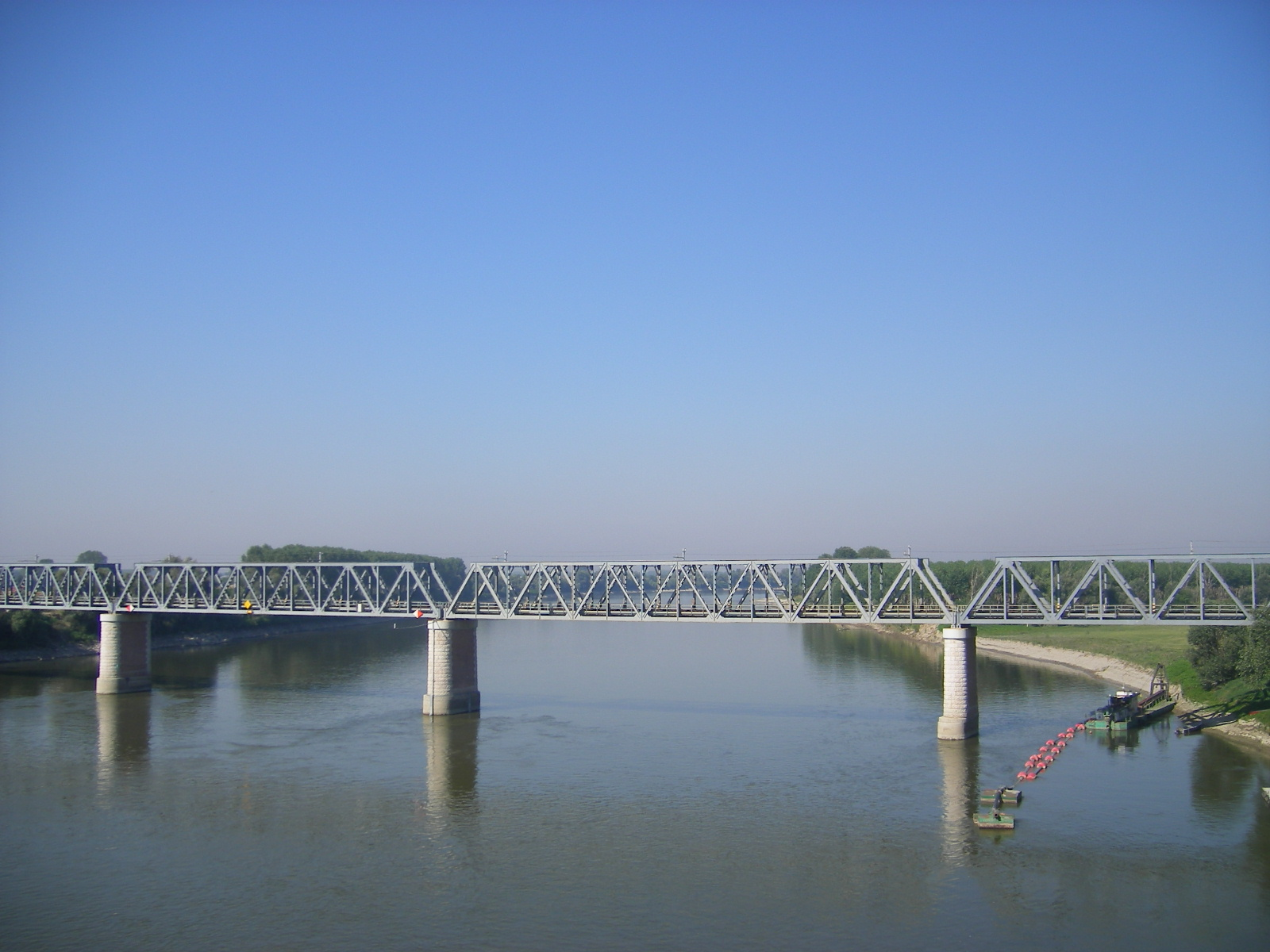

Overview
- Termini: Verona; Modena

Technical
- Line length: 97.1 km (60.3 mi)

The Verona–Mantua–Modena railway is a state-owned railway line that connects the city of Verona to Mantua and Modena, crossing the Po Valley.

It is managed by Rete Ferroviaria Italiana, which classifies it as a complementary line. Passenger traffic is served by Trenitalia and Trenitalia Tper regional trains.

In addition to the three cities that give the line its name, the main ones crossed are Carpi and Suzzara, while the interchange nodes with other lines are at the stations of Verona, Mantua, Suzzara, Quattro Ville (AV/AC interconnection) and Modena.

== History ==
=== The Verona-Sant'Antonio Mantovano line ===
In June 1849, the Grand Royal Imperial Commissioner for Railway Affairs of Lombardy-Veneto Luigi Negrelli had presented to the Ministry of Public Works of the Austrian Empire a project for a railway network for the Kingdom. His idea envisaged dividing the long Ferdinandea Milan-Venice railway, at that time partly already completed and partly in the process of being defined in terms of design, into two branches:

- the first would have passed through Peschiera, Desenzano, Brescia, Bergamo and Monza;
- the second would have gone down towards Mantua and from there would have continued towards Piadena, Cremona, Treviglio joining up with the line already built between the Bergamo town and Milan.

The Ministry, for financial reasons, was instead in favour of building a single line and for this reason opted for the northern branch passing through Peschiera and Desenzano. The possibility of a branch connecting Verona to Villafranca and Mantua, near Sant'Antonio Mantovano, was retained from Negrelli's project, with the aim of uniting two fortresses of the Austrian quadrilateral with a railway.

=== The project for Reggio ===
The Imperial Royal Privileged Lombard-Venetian Railway Company ( Kaiserlich königliche privilegierte Lombardisch-venetianische Eisenbahngesellschaft ), a company set up with the capital of the Rothschild and Talabot banking groups, acquired the operation of the line in March 1856. The company was also committed to the construction of a railway line that would take up Negrelli's original idea and which would therefore run from Milan to Mantua passing through Cremona and Treviglio. From the Virgilian city, the line would have joined near Borgoforte to another railway project that would have branched off from Reggio Emilia, on the Piacenza-Bologna line under construction.
