= Fossoli =

- Frazione
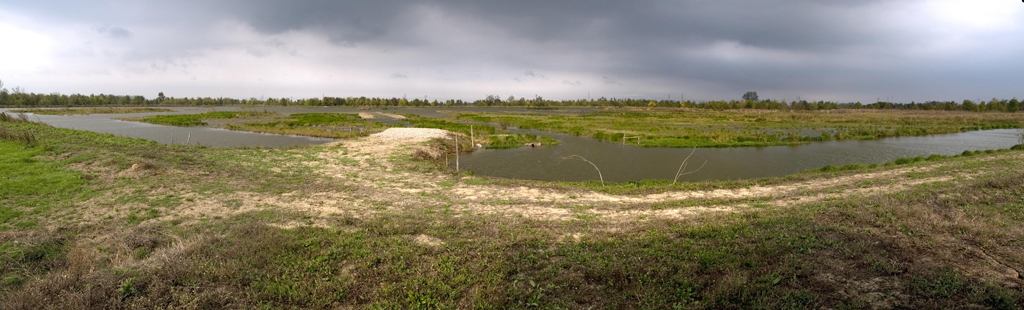
- View of the nature reserve "Oasi La Francesca"

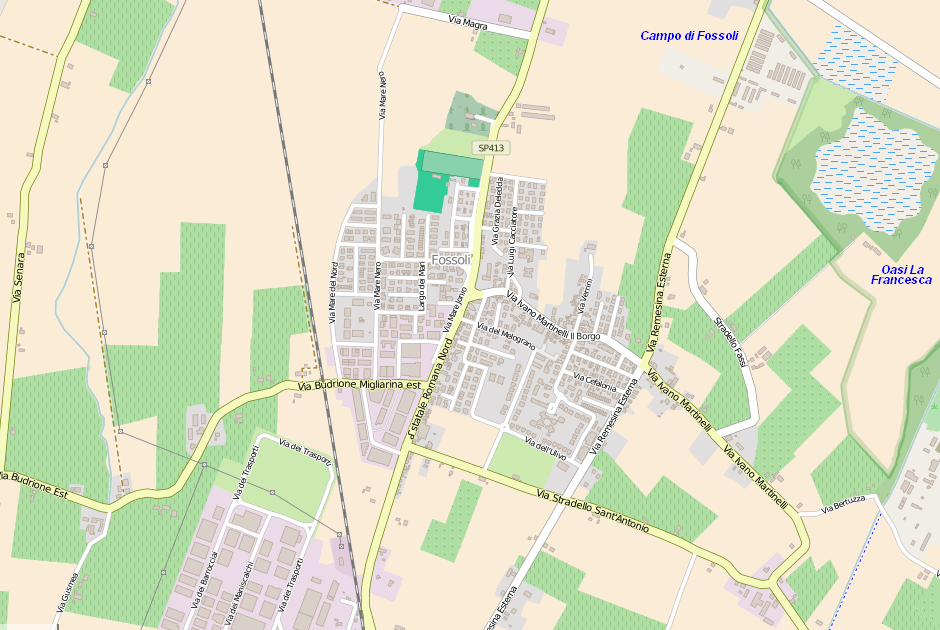
- OSM map of Fossoli also indicating the concentration camp and the nature reserve's entrance (both in the upper right corner)

- Location of Fossoli in Italy
- Coordinates: 44°49′20″N 10°53′25″E
- Country: Italy
- Region: Emilia-Romagna
- Province: Modena (MO)
- Comune: Carpi

Area
  - Total: 22.10 km^{2} (8.53 sq mi)
- Elevation: 22 m (72 ft)

Population (2016)
  - Total: 4,404
  - Density: 199.3/km^{2} (516.1/sq mi)
- Demonym: Fossolesi
- Time zone: UTC+1 (CET)
  - Summer (DST): UTC+2 (CEST)
- Postal code: 41012
- Dialing code: (+39) 059

Fossoli (Emilian: Fòsel) is an Italian village and hamlet (frazione) of Carpi, a city and municipality of the province of Modena, Emilia-Romagna. It is infamous for the eponymous concentration camp and has a population of about 4400.

== History ==
Born as a rural village, Fossoli sadly became infamous during World War II, for the concentration camp located near the settlement. Created in 1942 as a Prisoner of War (PoW) camp, in 1943 it became a concentration camp for Jews, during the Italian Social Republic.

== Geography ==
Fossoli lies on a plain, next to the Province of Reggio Emilia, between Carpi (5 km south) and Novi di Modena (8 km north). It is crossed by the provincial highway SP413 and, in the west, by the Verona–Mantua–Modena railway, on which stood a station, now closed. The village is 27 km from Modena, 32 from Reggio Emilia, 51 from Mantua, and 68 from Bologna.

Next to Fossoli is located the WWF nature reserve "Oasi La Francesca", a marsh that extends for 23 hectares.

== Personalities ==
- Amleto Frignani (1932-1997), footballer

== Gallery ==
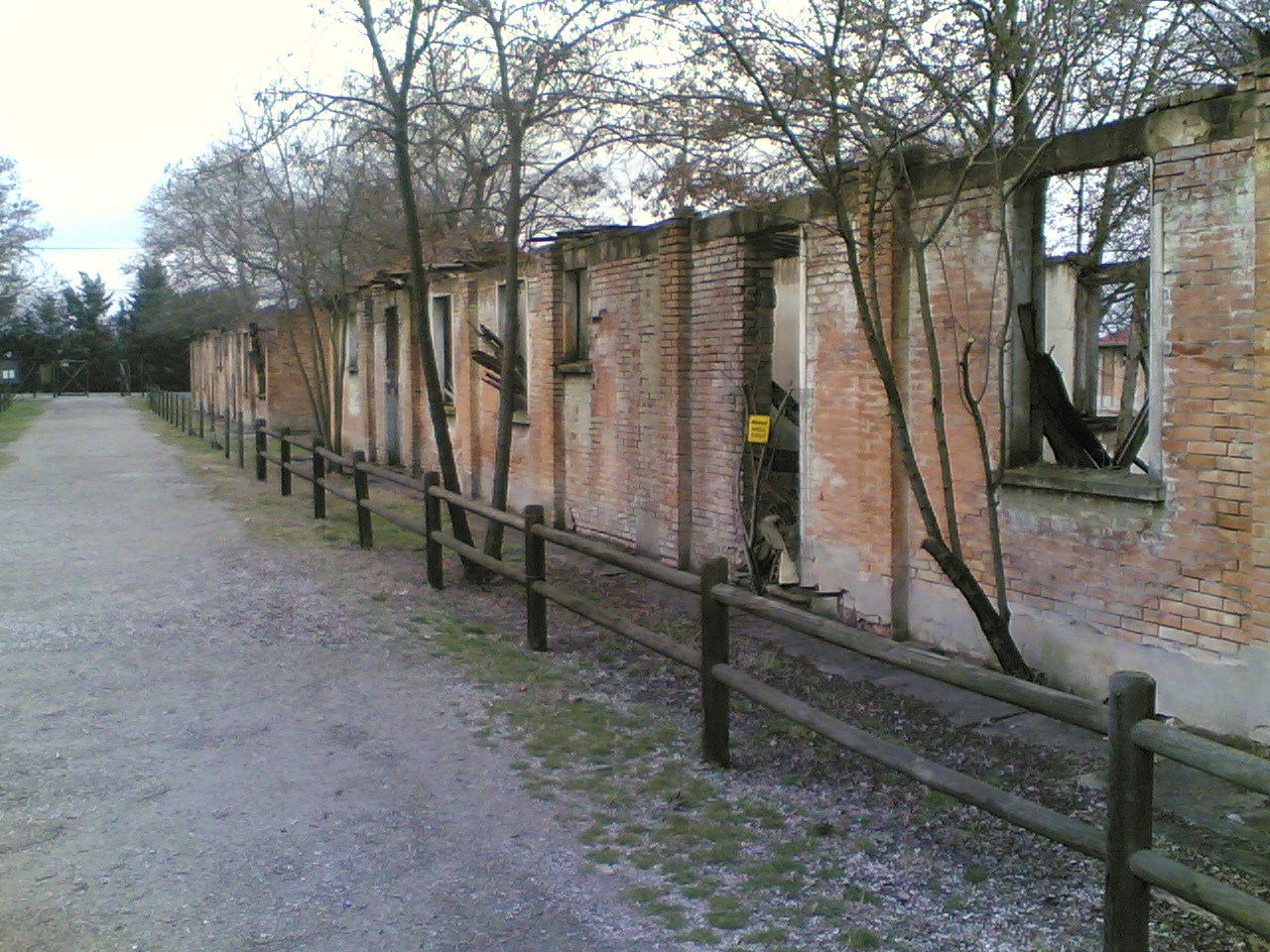
Some barracks of the Fossoli concentration camp in 2010

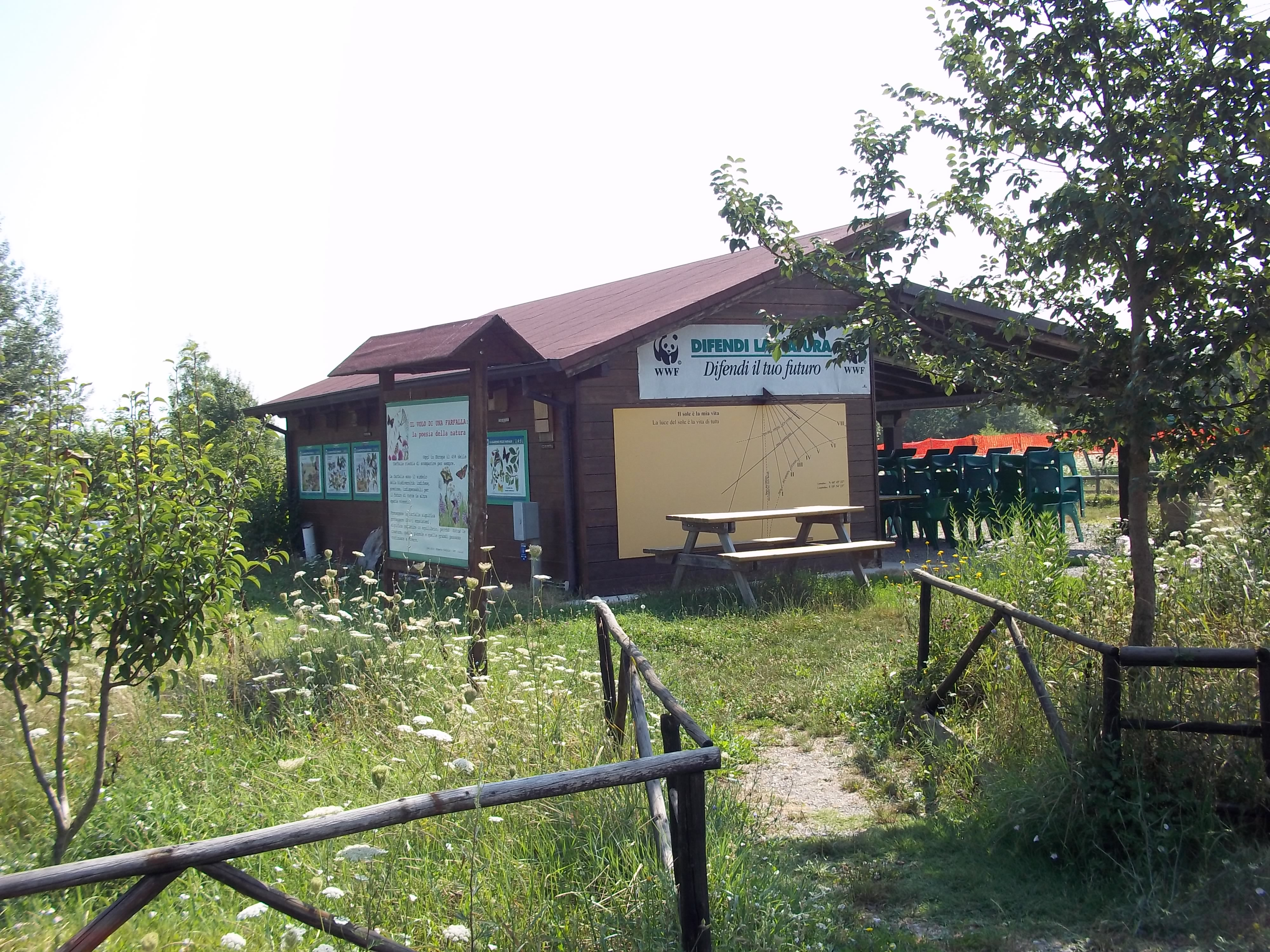
Info point at the entrance of the nature reserve "Oasi La Francesca"
