= Camilla Pio di Savoia =

Italian noblewoman and abbess

- Born: c. 1440; Carpi, Italy
- Died: 15 April 1504; Carpi, Italy
- Burial place: In the church of Santa Chiara, Carpi
- Occupation: Abbess
- Known for: Founder of first female monastery in Carpi
- Parents: Giberto I Pio (father); Elisabetta Migliorati (mother)

Camilla Pio di Savoia (c. 1440 – 1504) was born an Italian noblewoman and later founded the first female monastery in Carpi, Italy, Santa Chiara, of which she was elected abbess. Her Cause for Canonization has been opened.

== Life ==
Camilla was born into a noble family in Carpi, Italy as the daughter of Giberto II Pio and Elisabetta Migliorati. Because she belonged to the Pio family, the lords of Carpi, she was second cousin to Alberto III Pio.

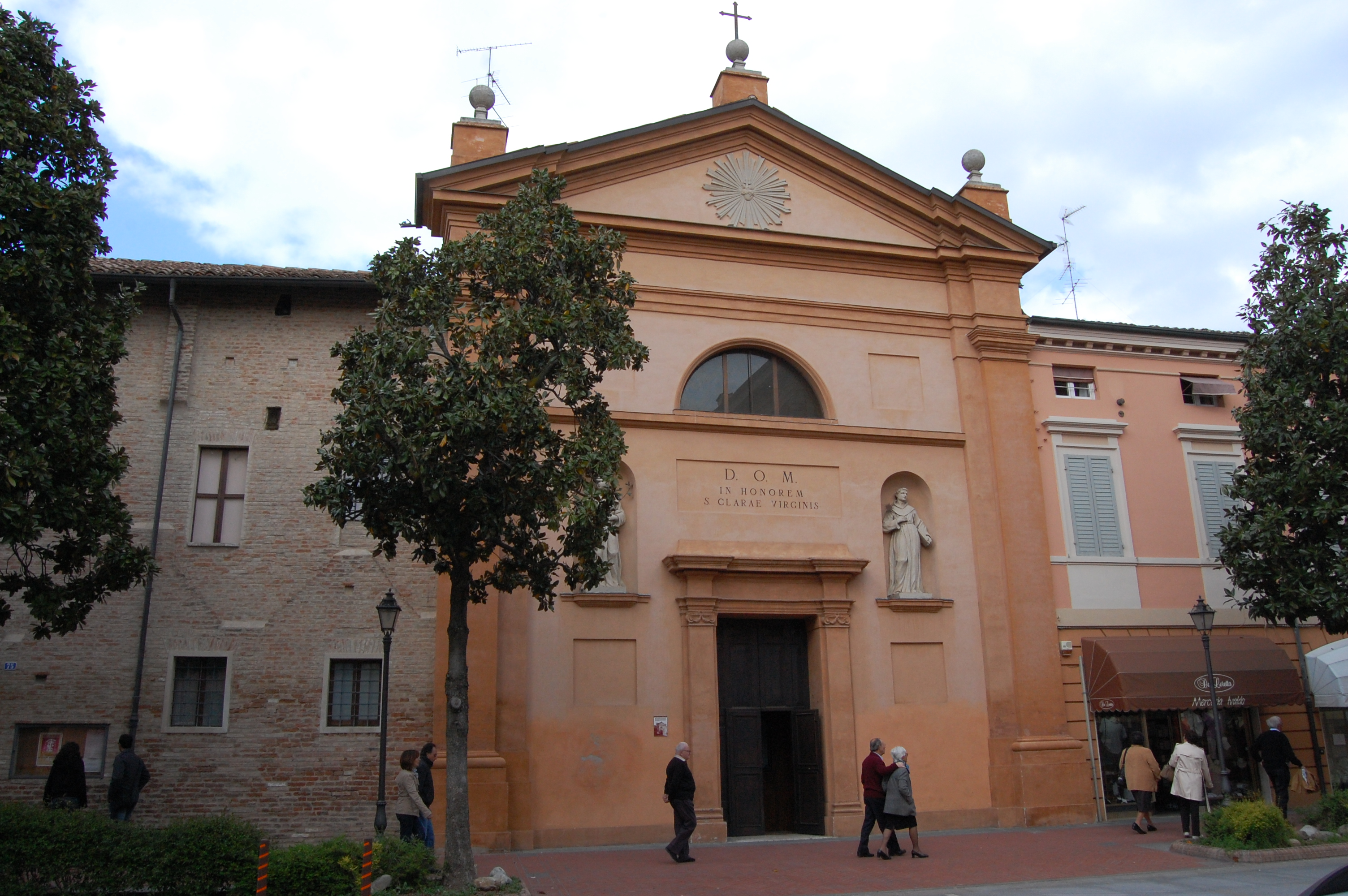
Façade of the Santa Chiara church and flanking monastery

Camilla was considered a cultured and devoted woman when, in 1471, she received a substantial inheritance from her paternal aunt Margherita Pio, the second wife and widow of the condottiere Taddeo d'Este. Camilla took that opportunity to pursue a cloistered life and decided to establish the first female monastery in Carpi dedicated to St. Clare (in Italian: Santa Chiara).

To begin, Camilla obtained a Papal bull with the authorization of Pope Innocent VIII in 1490, and immediately began to build a church and monastery. During construction, she moved into an adjacent house to live a more monastic life with some female companions. By giving up court life to live in poverty, following the example of Saint Clare of Assisi, Camilla became considered holy; the place where they lived was popularly known as a monastery. In 1494 Alberto III Pio and her half-nephew Giberto III, co-Lords of Carpi, gave Camilla a large landed property, the Cassina (500 biolche of land) north of Carpi, and allowed her to incorporate a road into the monastery's garden, so the nuns would have a large green space for meditation, in addition to the cloister.

With the completion of monastery construction in 1500, Camilla officially joined the Poor Clare Nuns as a novice together with the other sisters who already lived with her and Violante Pio, sister of Giberto II. Camilla was elected abbess and she died there only four years later, 15 April 1504 of natural causes.

The monastery that Camilla founded is still active; in a chapel of the church of Santa Chiara it is possible to see her incorrupt remains. Several prodigies and miracles have been credited to her and among some Franciscan martyrologists, she is already called "Blessed." The beatification process, closed in the diocesan phase, is still ongoing at the Congregation of Saints in Rome.

A street in the municipality of Carpi, Via Camilla Pio, is named after her.
