= Galasso Alghisi =

Italian architect, military engineer and author

- Born: 1523; Carpi, near Modena, Italy
- Died: 1573 (aged 49–50); Italy
- Citizenship: Italy
- Occupations: Architect, military engineer, author

Galasso Alghisi (1523–1573) was an Italian architect, military engineer and author of the Renaissance period.

He is also known as Galeazzo Alghisi or Galeazzo da Carpi.

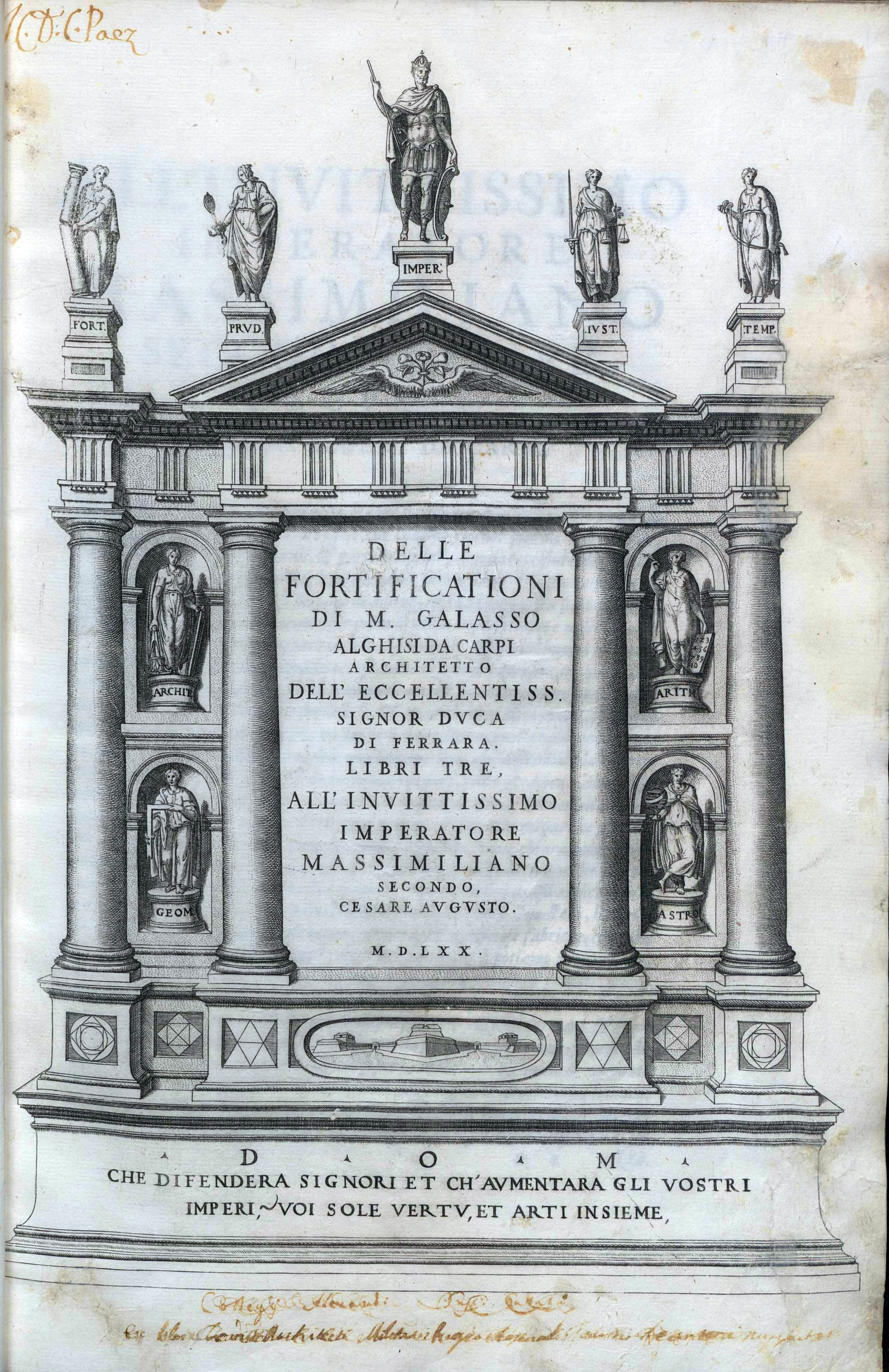
Delle fortificationi, title page (1570)

== Biography ==
Born in Carpi, near Modena, he was architect to the duke of Ferrara. He published a book in Venice in 1570 on fortifications.

He also published an Opus on architecture, specially of buildings in Rome. It includes simple engravings showing Fonte Sista in Rome; a view of the Belvedere, vatican gardens, and an incomplete St Peter's Basilica; the Villa d'Este in Tivoli; the arrangements of statuary in the niches of the Loggia del Lione of the Villa Medici in the Pincio district of Rome; dimensions of a palace resembling Palace of Raphael in Rome; the construction by Michelangelo in St Peter's including his putative design without Carlo Maderno's facade and showing the adjacent Vatican palace at the time (the obelisk in the position not reached till the 1580s); House by Bramante in Rome; San Giovanni Laterano with adjacent Lateran Palace; Facade, cross section, and courtyard of Palazzo Farnese with Farnese Hercules; Senate house on Capitoline Hill; a reconstruction of the Theater of Marcellus; Ponte Sant'Angelo and Castel Sant'Angelo before decoration; the ruins of the Colloseum and sites of the Roman Forum.

== Works ==
- Opus (in Latin). Dominicus Thebaldius. 1566.
- Delle fortificationi (in Italian). Venezia. 1570.

== Bibliography ==
- Ticozzi, Stefano (1830). Dizionario degli architetti, scultori, pittori, intagliatori in rame ed in pietra, coniatori di medaglie, musaicisti, niellatori, intarsiatori d'ogni etá e d'ogni nazione (in Italian). Vol. 1. Milan: Gaetano Schiepatti. p. 40.
- Quintavalle, Armando O. (1960). "ALGHISI, Galassi". Dizionario Biografico degli Italiani (in Italian). Vol. 2: Albicante–Ammannati. Rome: Istituto dell'Enciclopedia Italiana. OCLC 883370.
