= Santa Maria in Castello, Carpi =

Roman Catholic Church in Carpi, Italy

Church of St Mary in the Castle; Chiesa di Santa Maria in Castello (Italian); Chiesa della Sagra
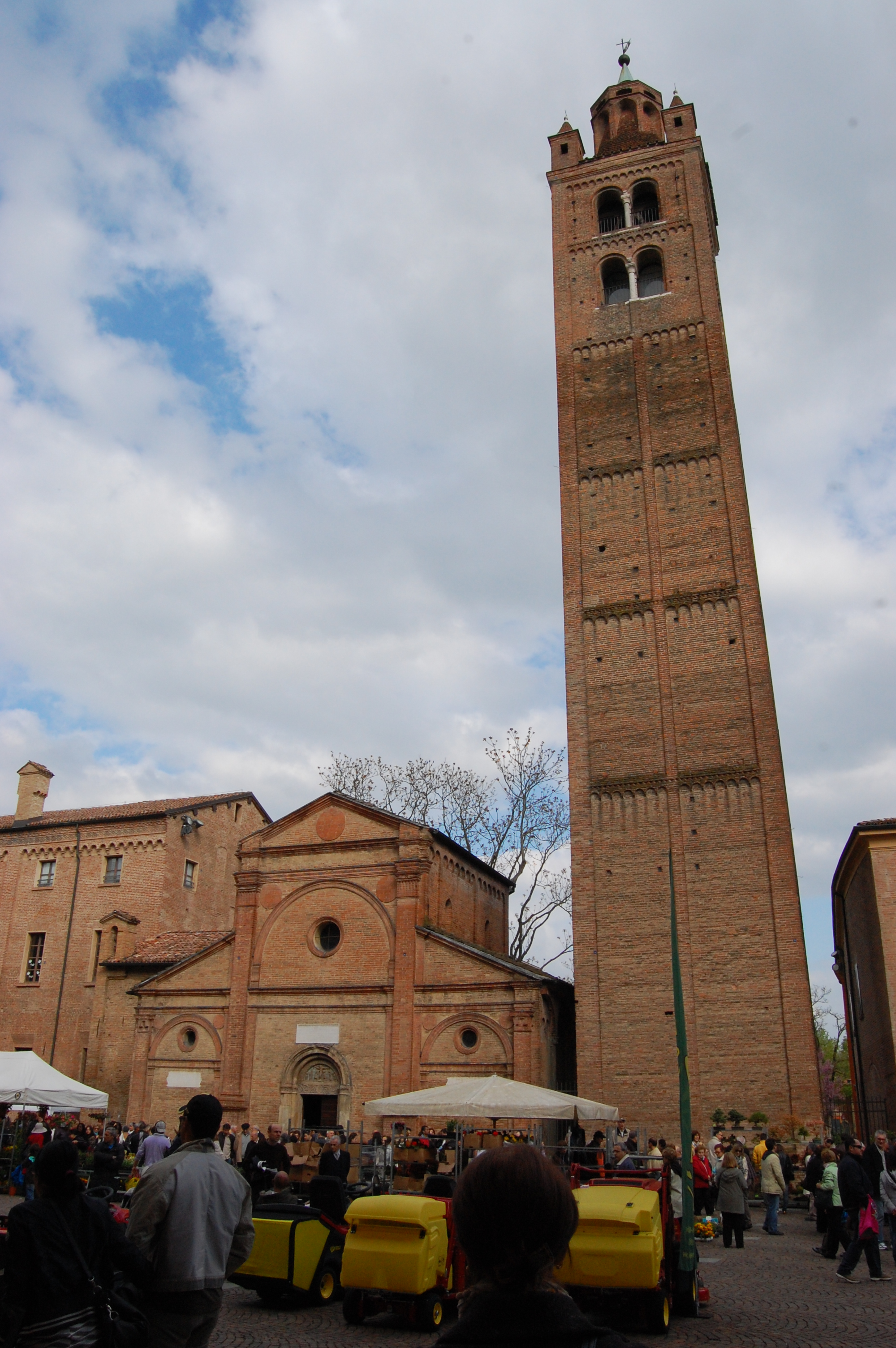

Religion
- Affiliation: Catholic
- Year consecrated: 1184

Location
- Location: Carpi, Italy
- Interactive map of: Church of St Mary in the Castle; Chiesa di Santa Maria in Castello (Italian); Chiesa della Sagra
- Coordinates: 44°46′58″N 10°53′12″E

Architecture
- Architect: Peruzzi (facade)
- Style: Romanesque

The parish church (Pieve) of Santa Maria in Castello, also known as the Chiesa della Sagra, is a Romanesque style church in the city of Carpi, near Modena, Italy. It is remarkable for its Romanesque sculpted pulpit and portal, attributed to the school of Benedetto Antelami. The church was consecrated in 1184.

== History ==
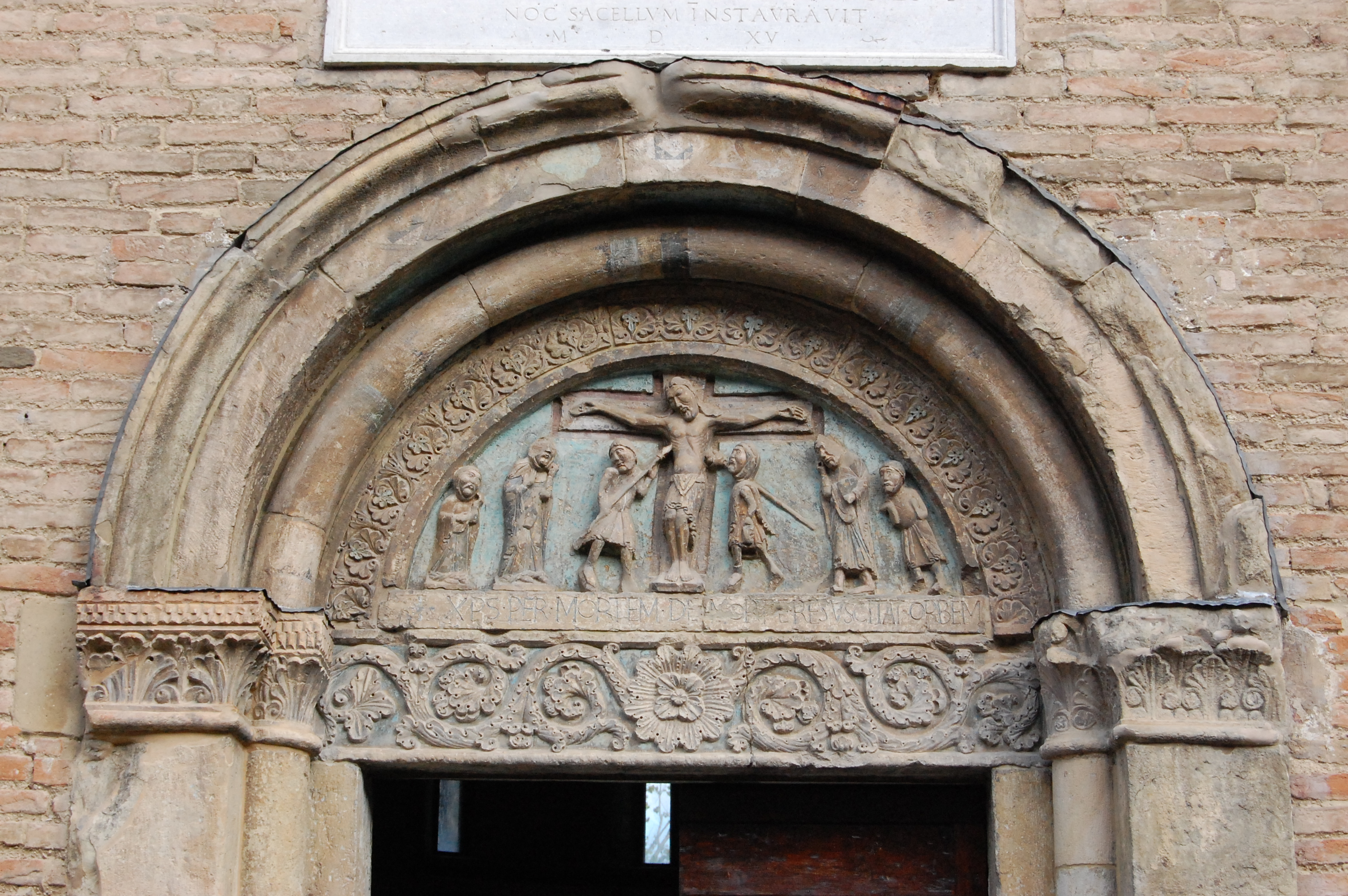
Romanesque Portal depicting the Crucifixion.

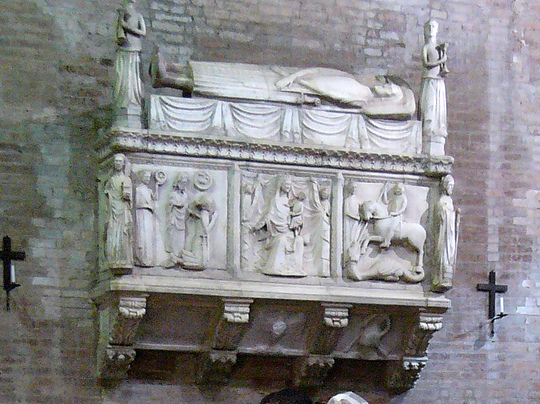
Sarcophagus of Manfredo Pio.

Tradition holds that the church was founded by the Lombard king Aistulf in 752, however documentary evidence only exists from the 9th century (879).

The present layout originally was laid out in the 12th century, under the patronage of Matilde di Canossa. The nave and interior was altered substantially in the year 1514, leaving only the apse as the only remaining medieval portion with some traces of frescoes. The facade (1515) was designed by Baldassarre Peruzzi. The nearly 50 meter high bell-tower was a late addition.

The interior was restored in the late 19th century under the guidance of Achille Sammarini, who aimed to highlight the antique elements including the portal with a crucifixion, the sarcophagus of Manfredo I Pio (1351), and the early 14th-century frescoes in the chapels of St Catherine and St Martin, work of Antonio Alberti of Ferrara.
