= Roberto Corradi =

Italian footballer

Personal information
- Full name: Roberto Corradi
- Date of birth: January 29, 1975 (age 51)
- Place of birth: Carpi, Italy
- Height: 1.71 m (5 ft 7 in)
- Position: Midfielder

Senior career*
Years	Team	Apps	(Gls)
1992–1999	Carpi	149	(4)
1999–2001	Brescello	44	(4)
2000–2002	Catania	27	(1)
2001–2002	Crotone	6	(0)
2002–2003	Sambenedettese	24	(3)
2003–2004	Monza	26	(2)
2004–2005	Spezia	10	(0)
2005–2006	Latina	13	(0)
2005–2006	San Marino Calcio	16	(0)
2006–2007	Pistoiese	9	(0)
2007	→ Pro Vercelli (loan)	13	(0)
2007–2008	San Marino Calcio	15	(1)
- * Club domestic league appearances and goals

Roberto Corradi (born 29 January 1975) is an Italian former footballer who played as a midfielder.

== See also ==
- Football in Italy
- List of football clubs in Italy
