= Galasso I Pio =

Galasso I Pio (died March 13, 1367) was the lord of Carpi, Italy from 1348 until his death. A member of the Pio family, he was the son of Manfredo I Pio, from whom he inherited the lordship. In 1359 he was also appointed captain of the people of Bologna.

He was succeeded by his son Giberto.
