= Nomadelfia =

Intentional community in Grosseto, Italy

Nomadelfia is an intentional community in Grosseto, Italy. It is composed of practising Catholics following a lifestyle inspired by the Acts of the Apostles, i.e. an attempted return to the early church. According to the Catholic Church, Nomadelfia is a parish of married families and lay people, and to the Italian state it is a private association of citizens.

The residents of Nomadelfi are not all members of the community; only after the age of 21 can someone decide to join. Nomadelfia does not use money, and those who do obtain income from outside the community pay into a central pot which helps provide for everyone.

== Origins ==
The community was founded by Zeno Saltini. After World War II, he turned a former concentration camp (the Fossoli di Carpi near Modena, Emilia-Romagna) into a refuge for orphaned children. Saltini also set up a satellite community on the present site of Nomadelfia, in Maremma, Tuscany. He was ordered to leave Fossoli in 1952 by the Church and Fossoli was closed, with huge debts; Saltini moved to the Nomadelfia site, and in 1962 he was recognized as its parish priest.
