= San Bernardino da Siena, Carpi =

Church in Carpi, Italy

Coordinates: 44.7811°N 10.8822°E

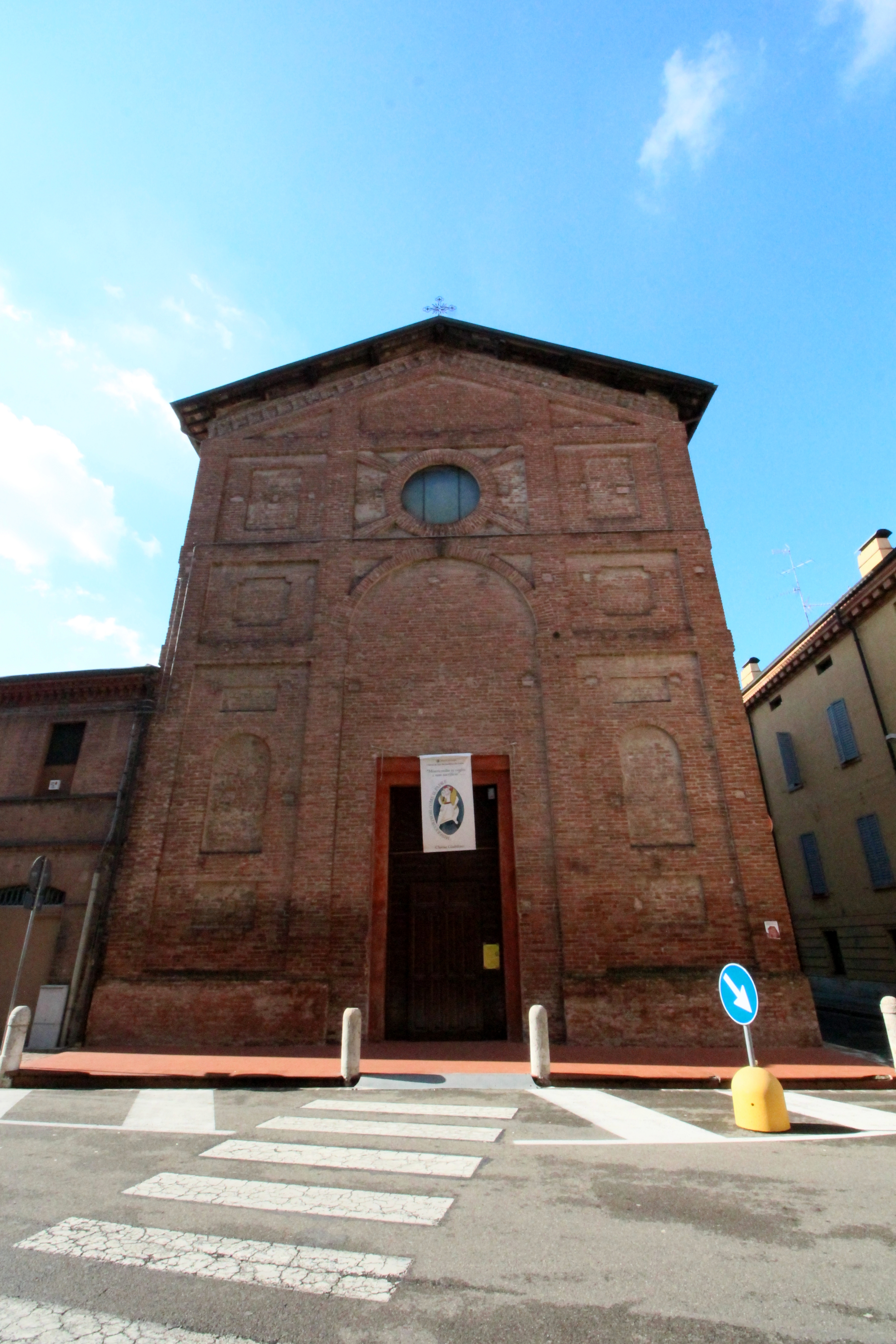
Facade of the church

San Bernardino da Siena and the adjacent Capuchin order Monastery are a Roman Catholic, Baroque style church and convent respectively, located on Via Trento Trieste 20 in central Carpi, Emilia-Romagna, Italy. San Bernardino da Siena is the patron saint of Carpi.

== History ==
The church was built in 1604 under the auspices of a confraternity, and was adorned with masterworks such as canvases by Marco Meloni, Ludovico Carracci, and Guercino, all of which are now substituted by copies, the originals in the Galleria Estense. However the original 18th-century altar with a reliquary bust (1857) of the title saint (by Giovanni Belleza), and smaller altarpieces remain including a Martyrdom of St Lawrence by Jacopo Palma il Giovane, a San Carlo Borromeo by Carlo Procaccini, and a canvas by Stefano Lemmi. The reliquary bust was donated in gratitude for passing of a cholera epidemic.

The church was damaged by the 2012 Northern Italy earthquakes, and reopened in March 2014 after a restoration directed by the architect Paolo Giubertoni. The church will serve as the church for the Missionari Servi dei Poveri, the Capuchin nunnery, and as a parish church.
