= Carpi Cathedral =

Cathedral in Carpi, Emilia-Romagna, Italy

Coordinates: 44.78496°N 10.88626°E

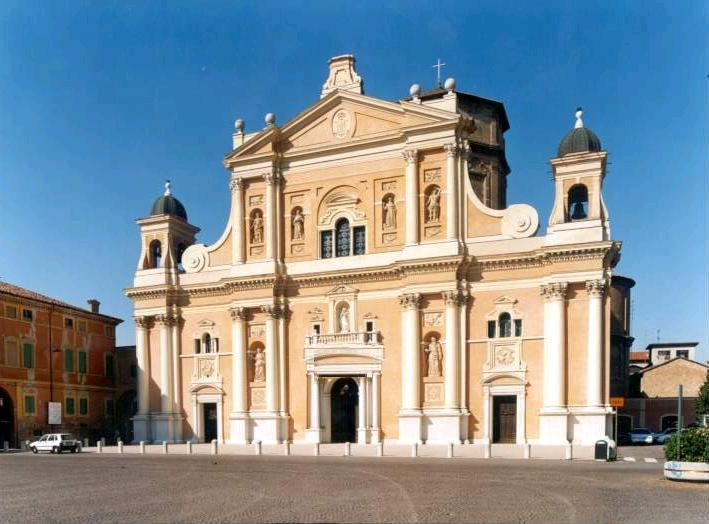
West front of the cathedral

Carpi Cathedral (Italian: Duomo di Carpi; Basilica cattedrale di Santa Maria Assunta) is a Roman Catholic cathedral in Carpi, Emilia-Romagna, Italy, dedicated to the Assumption of the Virgin Mary. It is the episcopal seat of the Diocese of Carpi. It stands on the site of a mediaeval pieve dedicated to Mary.

== History ==
The original church was built by King Aistulf in 756. Construction on the present building began around 1514, predating the establishment of the diocese here in 1779 by over 250 years. The church was designed by Baldassare Peruzzi under his patron Alberto III Pio, Count of Carpi.

With the creation of the diocese in 1779, the cathedral was assigned a Chapter, which was to consist of four dignities (the Archpriest, the Archdeacon, the Provost, and the Dean) and seventeen Canons. The first bishop was Francesco Benincasa.

The cathedral has a Baroque facade and a Latin cross floorplan.

It was granted the status of a minor basilica in 1979, on the occasion of the bicentenary of the establishment of the diocese.

The building was seriously damaged during the earthquakes that struck in 2012. After restoration work it was reopened for worship on 25 March 2017 with a solemn ceremony led by Cardinal Pietro Parolin. The restoration included in the installation of a new lighting system.
