= Carpi, Emilia-Romagna =

Carpi Chèrp (Emilian)
- Comune
- Città di Carpi
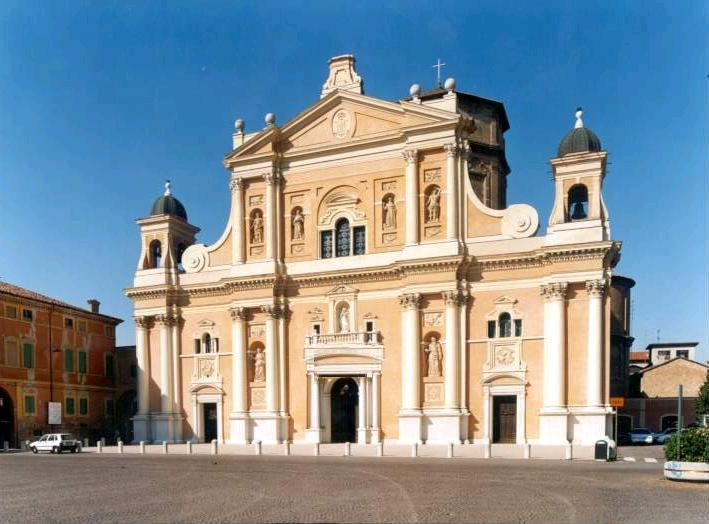
- Carpi Cathedral or Duomo

- Flag Coat of arms

- Carpi within the Province of Modena

- Location within Italy Location within Emilia-Romagna
- Coordinates: 44°47′N 10°53′E
- Country: Italy
- Region: Emilia-Romagna
- Province: Modena (MO)
- Frazioni: Budrione, Cantone di Gargallo, Cibeno Pile, Cortile, Fossoli, Gargallo, Lama di Quartirolo, Migliarina, Osteriola, San Marino, San Martino Secchia, Santa Croce

Government
  - Mayor: Riccardo Righi (Centrosinistra)

Area
  - Total: 131.54 km^{2} (50.79 sq mi)
- Elevation: 28 m (92 ft)

Population (31 July 2025)
  - Total: 73,796
  - Density: 561.02/km^{2} (1,453.0/sq mi)
- Demonym: Carpigiani
- Time zone: UTC+1 (CET)
  - Summer (DST): UTC+2 (CEST)
- Postal code: 41012
- Dialing code: 059
- Patron saint: San Bernardino da Siena
- Saint day: 20 May
- Website: Official website

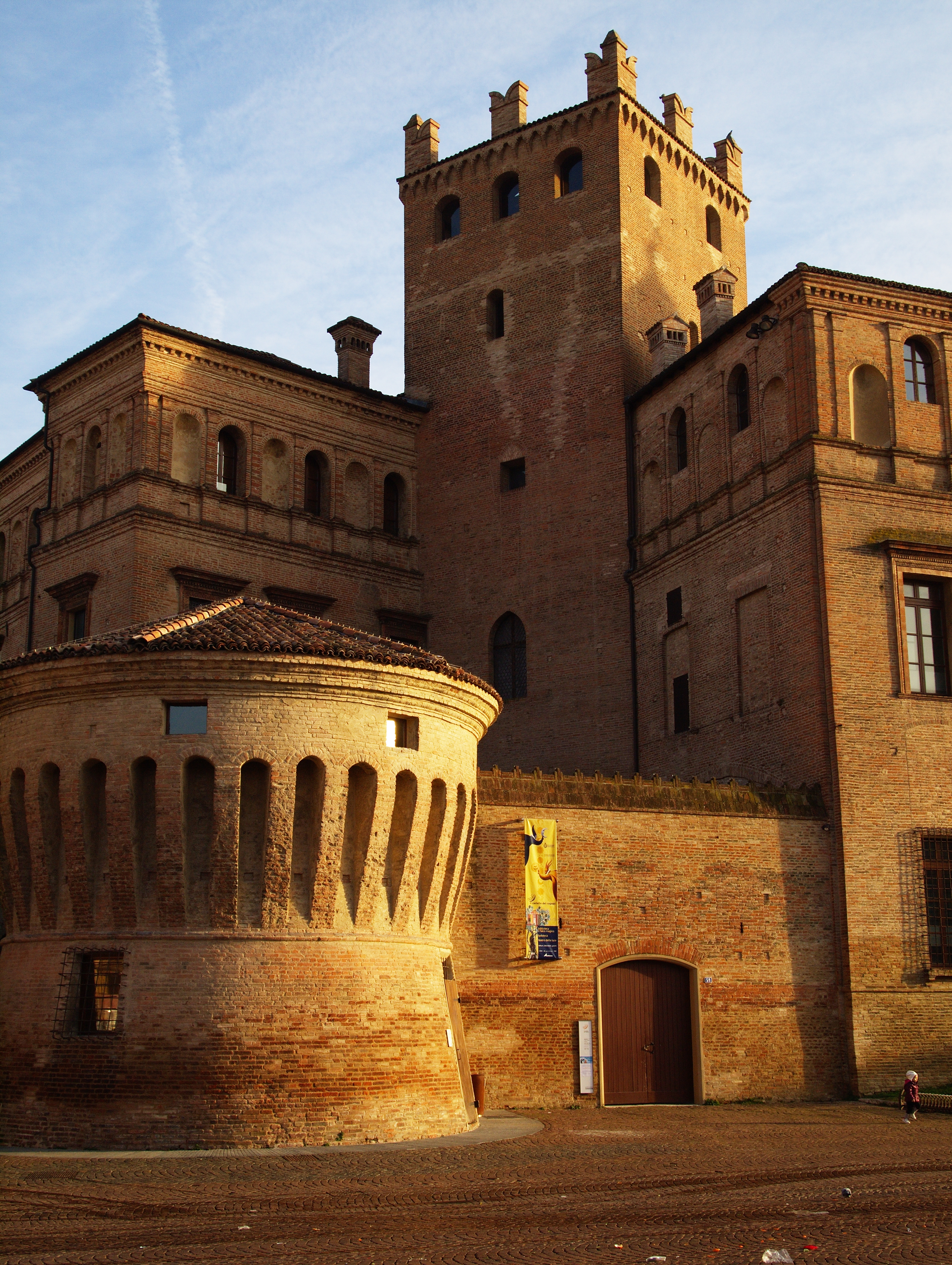
The town hall, housed by "Palazzo dei Pio".

Carpi (Italian: [ˈkarpi]; Emilian: Chèrp) is an Italian town and comune of about 73,000 inhabitants in the province of Modena, Emilia-Romagna. It is a busy centre for industrial and craft activities and for cultural and commercial exchanges.

== Geography ==
It located in the northern area of its province, at the borders with Reggio Emilia and counts the hamlets (frazioni) of Budrione, Cantone di Gargallo, Cibeno Pile, Cortile, Fossoli, Gargallo, Lama di Quartirolo, Migliarina, Osteriola, San Marino, San Martino Secchia and Santa Croce.

Carpi borders with the municipalities of Campogalliano, Cavezzo, Correggio (RE), Fabbrico (RE), Modena, Novi di Modena, Rio Saliceto (RE), Rolo (RE), San Prospero and Soliera.

== History ==
The name Carpi is derived from carpinus 'hornbeam', a tree particularly widespread in medieval times in the Po Valley region. In prehistoric times it was a settlement of the Villanovan Culture.

The foundation by the Lombard king Aistulf of St. Mary's Church in the castle (Castrum Carpi) in 752 was the first step in the current settlement of the city. From 1319 to 1525, it was ruled by the Pio family, after whom it was acquired by the Este, as part of the Duchy of Modena.

The city received a silver medal for Military Valour in recognition of its participation in the resistance against the German occupation during World War II.

The town has one of the largest squares in all Italy (3rd place), the heart of the city, Piazza dei Martiri. It is surrounded by the castle, the cathedral, the town hall, and a portico with 52 arches. Usually every Thursday and Saturday the square hosts the local market.

Carpi used to be the finishing point of the annual Italian Marathon, which begins in nearby Maranello. Almost 1000 athletes enter the senior men's and women's race which has been held every year since 1988 in honor of Dorando Pietri, a long-distance runner born in Carpi that lost his Olympic gold medal for being helped to stand up after a fall near the finish line. The area was crippled in the earthquakes of May 2012.

=== Title ===
As a titular Duke of Modena, the current holder of the title of "Prince of Carpi" would be Prince Lorenz of Belgium, Archduke of Austria-Este.

== Demographics evolution ==
Historical population

Year	Pop.	±%
1861	16,698	—
1871	17,913	+7.3%
1881	18,856	+5.3%
1901	22,876	+21.3%
1911	27,465	+20.1%
1921	30,880	+12.4%
1931	33,823	+9.5%
1936	34,189	+1.1%

Year	Pop.	±%
1951	37,643	+10.1%
1961	45,208	+20.1%
1971	55,099	+21.9%
1981	60,614	+10.0%
1991	60,715	+0.2%
2001	61,476	+1.3%
2011	67,268	+9.4%
2021	71,402	+6.1%

Source: ISTAT

=== Foreign ethnicities and minorities ===
Foreign citizens living in Carpi amount to 10,756 persons, making 14.8% of the town population. The largest foreign community is that from Pakistan with 24% of all foreigners present in the town, followed by Romania and the People's Republic of China.

== Main sights ==
Carpi is distinguished by its great Renaissance square (piazza), called Piazza Martiri It is flanked by a portico with 52 columns.

Other notable landmarks include:

- Town hall (Palazzo dei Pio) - formerly the castle of the Pio family. It includes parts from different ages, such as the merloned-tower of Passerino Bonaccolsi, the Renaissance façade and the tower of Galasso Pio, and the 17th century watch tower. It includes a chapel frescoed by Bernardino Loschi and Vincenzo Catena.
- Carpi Cathedral - Originally designed by Baldassarre Peruzzi, drawings for it are located in the Gabinetto dei Disegni e Stampe in the Uffizi, Florence, and document Peruzzi's contact with Leonardo da Vinci. Construction begun 1514, Baroque façade added in 1701 and cupola completed 1774).
- Church of Santa Maria in Castello or La Sagra - façade (1514) designed by Peruzzi .
- Church of Santa Chiara
- Church of Santissimo Crocifisso
- Church of San Bernardino Realino
- Church of San Bernardino da Siena
- Church of San Nicolò, Carpi
- Church of Sant'Ignazio- home of the Museum of the Diocese of Carpi
- Church of San Francesco d'Assisi

== Sports ==
The biggest football team in Carpi is Carpi FC 1909 who play in the 5510 capacity Stadio Sandro Cabassi. Carpi FC 1909 played in Serie B during the 2013–14 season, achieving a 12th-place finish ensuring second tier football remained in the town for another season. On April 28, 2015, the club clinched promotion to Serie A for the first time in its history. In 2016 the Carpi-born world champion swimmer Gregorio Paltrinieri won Gold Medal on 1,500 free style at Brazil Olympics.

== Notable people ==
- Jacopo Berengario da Carpi (1460–1530), physician
- Ermes Effron Borgnino, known as Ernest Borgnine (1917–2012), U.S. actor, was the son of Anna Boselli (1894–1949) who was born in Carpi
- Camilla Pio di Savoia, (1440–1504) founder of Santa Chiara at Carpi
- Liliana Cavani (born 1933), film director and screenwriter
- Alida Chelli (1943–2012), actress
- Roberto Corradi (born 1975), former footballer
- Ciro Menotti (1798–1831), patriot
- Gregorio Paltrinieri (born 1994), swimmer
- Galasso I Pio (died 1367), Prince of Carpi
- Alberto III Pio (1475–1531), prince and humanist
- Rodolfo Pio da Carpi (1500–1564), cardinal and humanist
- Bernardino Ramazzini (1633–1714), physician
- Carlo Rustichelli (1916–2004), composer
- Beppe Lopetrone (1950–2007), fashion photographer

== See also ==
- Fossoli concentration camp
- Cassa di Risparmio di Carpi
