= April 1944 =

Month of 1944

<<	April 1944					>>
Su	Mo	Tu	We	Th	Fr	Sa
						1
2	3	4	5	6	7	8
9	10	11	12	13	14	15
16	17	18	19	20	21	22
23	24	25	26	27	28	29
30

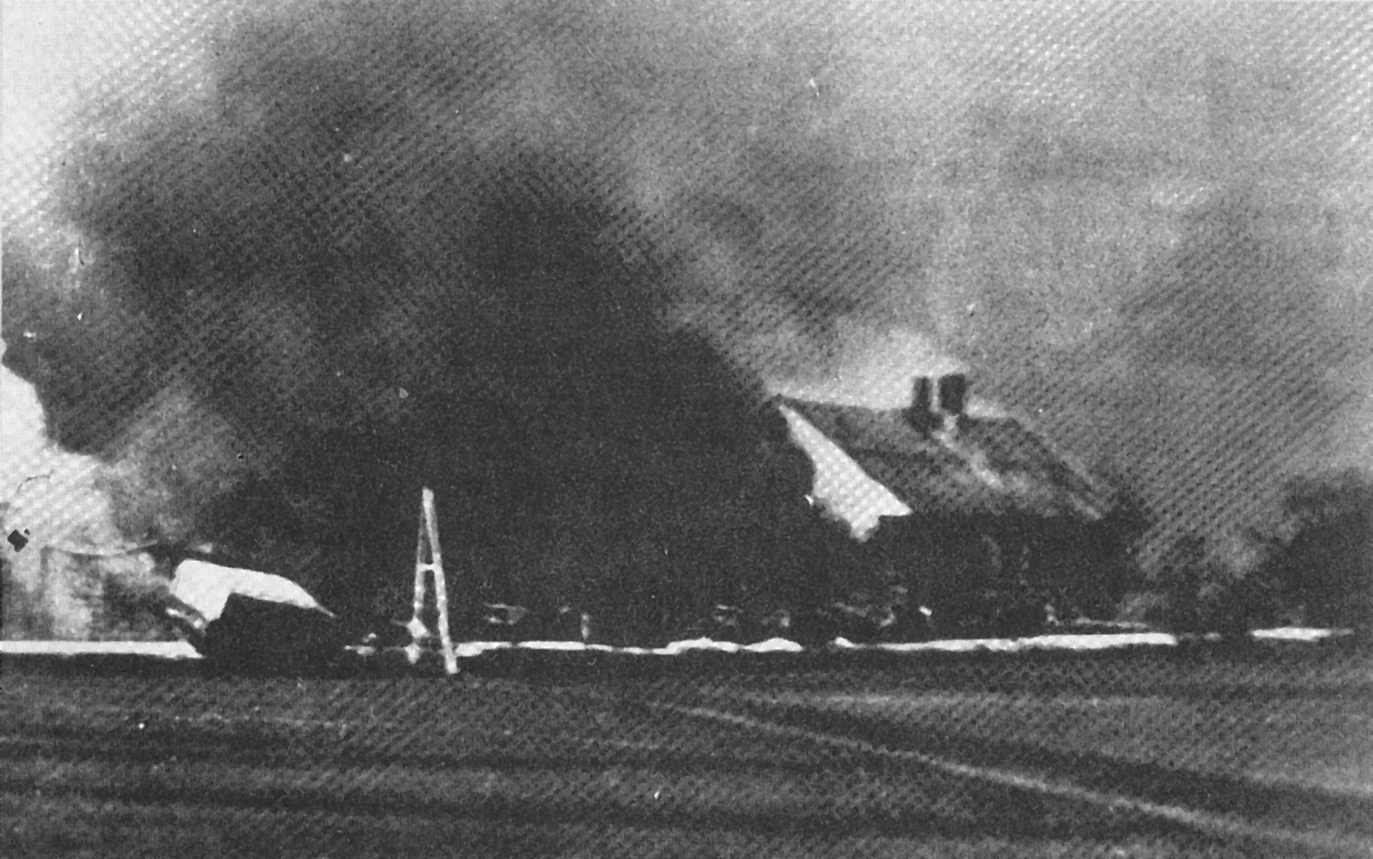
Attack on a German police column in April 1944.

The following events occurred in April 1944:

== April 1, 1944 (Saturday) ==
- The most significant bombing of Switzerland during World War II occurred when about 50 B-24s misidentified Schaffhausen as their target of Ludwigshafen and dropped bombs that resulted in 40 casualties.
- The first Allied air raid on Pforzheim, Germany occurred.
- The Waffen-SS committed the Ascq massacre of 86 men in Ascq, France.
- The British government banned visitors from going within ten miles of the coast between Land's End and the Wash.
- Born: Rusty Staub, baseball player, in New Orleans, Louisiana (d. 2018)

== April 2, 1944 (Sunday) ==
- Soviet forces crossed the Prut and entered Romania.
- The first Boeing B-29 Superfortress reached India after a long flight all the way from the United States through Britain and North Africa.
- German submarine U-360 was depth charged and sunk in the Norwegian Sea by British flotilla leader HMS Keppel.
- An uprising began in El Salvador against the rule of Maximiliano Hernández Martínez, but it was put down after four hours. 53 were killed and 134 injured.
- Died: Albin Wolf, 23, German flying ace (shot down near Pskov)

== April 3, 1944 (Monday) ==
- The Royal Navy carried out Operation Tungsten, an attack on the German battleship Tirpitz anchored in northern Norway. Fifteen bombs hit the battleship but the damage inflicted was not sufficient to sink or disable the target.
- German submarine U-288 was depth charged and sunk in the Barents Sea by Fairey Swordfish aircraft of 819 Squadron, Fleet Air Arm.
- Born: Tony Orlando, singer, in New York City;

== April 4, 1944 (Tuesday) ==
- On the Eastern Front, a counterattack by the German 4th Panzer Army captured Kovel.
- The Battle of Kohima began around the town of Kohima in British India.
- An Allied de Havilland Mosquito surveillance aircraft of 60 Squadron SAAF photographed Auschwitz concentration camp.
- Several Valentine DD tanks sank with the loss of six crew during training Exercise Smash I in Studland Bay, Dorset.
- The Allied Forces from the Mediterranean bombed objectives in Bucharest. 49 Axis fighters were shot down; while 12 Allied planes were lost.
- Charlie Chaplin was acquitted by a federal court in Los Angeles of violating the Mann Act.
- Born: Magda Aelvoet, politician, in Steenokkerzeel, Belgium

== April 5, 1944 (Wednesday) ==
- U.S. Marines occupied Utirik Atoll in the Marshall Islands.
- The Red Army cut the rail link from Odessa at Rozdilna.
- Hungarian authorities ordered all Jews to wear the yellow star.
- Born: Peter T. King, politician, in New York City

== April 6, 1944 (Thursday) ==
- German 1st Panzer Army forces in the Kamenets-Podolsky pocket completed their fighting withdrawal back to the German lines when they linked up with the 4th Panzer Army.
- German submarine U-302 was depth charged and sunk in the Atlantic Ocean by Royal Navy frigate Swale.
- German submarine U-455 went missing in the Ligurian Sea, probably lost to a naval mine.
- Born:
  - Judith McConnell, actress, in Pittsburgh, Pennsylvania
  - Felicity Palmer, mezzo-soprano, in Cheltenham, England
  - Anita Pallenberg, actress, model and fashion designer, in Rome, Italy (d. 2017)
  - Charles Sobhraj, serial killer, fraudster and thief, in Saigon, French Indochina
- Died: Rose O'Neill, 69, American illustrator, artist, writer and creator of the Kewpie characters

== April 7, 1944 (Friday) ==
- Adolf Hitler suspended all laws in Berlin and made Joseph Goebbels the sole administrator of the city.
- The narrow land bridge to the Crimean peninsula, held by the German 17th Army, came under attack from Soviet forces.
- The German 1st Panzer Army broke out of a Soviet encirclement near Buchach.
- Montagu Stopford's British XXXIII Corps was encircled by the Japanese near Jotsama, Burma.
- German submarine U-856 was scuttled in the Atlantic Ocean after taking heavy damage from U.S. warships.
- In the Fragheto massacre, German soldiers belonging to the 356th Infantry Division killed 30 civilians and 15 partisans in Fragheto, a frazione of Casteldelci in central-northern Italy,
- Born:
  - Shel Bachrach, American insurance broker, investor, businessman and philanthropist in Detroit, Michigan (d. 2024)
  - Gerhard Schröder, Chancellor of Germany, in Mossenberg, Germany

== April 8, 1944 (Saturday) ==
- Soviet forces began the First Jassy–Kishinev Offensive, a coordinated invasion of Romania.
- The Germans began running long distance cargo flights between Polish airfields and Manchuria, flying Junkers Ju 290 A-9 aircraft at altitudes of up to 38,000 feet to cross the Soviet Union undetected.
- The Battle of the Tennis Court began as part of the Battle of Kohima.
- German submarine U-2 sank near Pillau in a collision with the trawler Helmi Söhle.
- German submarine U-962 was depth charged and sunk northwest of Cape Finisterre by British warships.
- The stage musical Follow the Girls with music and lyrics by Dan Shapiro, Milton Pascal and Phil Charig and book by Guy Bolton and Fred Thompson premiered at the New Century Theatre on Broadway.
- Born: Odd Nerdrum, painter, in Helsingborg, Sweden; Jimmy Walker, basketball player, in Amherst, Virginia (d. 2007)

== April 9, 1944 (Sunday) ==
- The First Battle of Târgu Frumos began on the Eastern Front.
- Charles de Gaulle became Commander-in-Chief of the Free French forces, ending a power struggle with Henri Giraud since the two men became co-presidents of the French Committee of National Liberation.
- German submarine U-515 was sunk north of Madeira by U.S. destroyers and aircraft.
- On the Cassino Front in Italy, there was a temporary ceasefire, as three U.S. ministers broadcast an Easter sermon over loudspeakers to both Allied and German troops.
- Died: Yevgeniya Rudneva, 23, Russian aviator and Hero of the Soviet Union (shot down near Kerch, Crimea)

== April 10, 1944 (Monday) ==
- The RAF dropped a record 3,600 tons of bombs in a single raid on Germany, France and Belgium.
- General William Slim ordered a new offensive in Burma, calling for Stopford to break through to Kohima while the Imphal Garrison would make sorties into Japanese-held territory around them.
- During the Dnieper–Carpathian Offensive, the Soviet 3rd Ukrainian Front captured Odessa.
- German submarine U-68 was sunk in the Atlantic Ocean by U.S. aircraft.

== April 11, 1944 (Tuesday) ==
- Soviet forces took Dzhankoy and Kerch in the Crimea.
- Japanese destroyer Akigumo was torpedoed and sunk in the Moro Gulf by the American submarine Redfin.
- German submarine U-108 was bombed and sunk at Stettin in an American air raid.
- Born: John Milius, filmmaker, in St. Louis, Missouri

== April 12, 1944 (Wednesday) ==
- The First Battle of Târgu Frumos ended in Axis victory.
- German forces began withdrawing from the Crimea.
- Japanese submarine I-174 was sunk east of Truk by a U.S. B-24 Liberator.
- Died: Adolf Wagner, 53, German soldier and Nazi official

== April 13, 1944 (Thursday) ==
- The Soviets took Simferopol.
- Japanese destroyer Ikazuchi was torpedoed and sunk 200 nautical miles south-southeast of Guam by American submarine Harder.
- The Montreal Canadiens defeated the Chicago Black Hawks 5-4 in overtime to win the Stanley Cup in a four-game sweep.
- Born: Jack Casady, rock bassist (Jefferson Airplane, Hot Tuna), in Washington, D.C.

== April 14, 1944 (Friday) ==
- The Bombay Explosion occurred in the Victoria Dock of Bombay when the freighter Fort Stikine caught fire and was destroyed in two giant blasts that killed about 800 people.
- The Japanese roadblock to the west of Kohima was broken and the encircled British XXXIII Corps was relieved after a week.
- German submarine U-448 was depth charged and sunk northeast of the Azores by Allied warships.

== April 15, 1944 (Saturday) ==
- The Soviets liberated Tarnopol.
- Operation Guidance: British submarine X24 attacked a floating dock at Bergen in occupied Norway. The mission did not quite come off as planned when the charges were placed on a large merchant vessel instead of the dock; the ship was sunk but the dock only took minor damage. The operation was repeated on September 11 and this time the dock was sunk.
- The American aircraft carrier USS Yorktown launched a raid on Chichijima and Iwo Jima.
- The American aircraft carrier USS Hancock was commissioned.
- Died: Giovanni Gentile, 68, Italian philosopher and politician (shot by anti-Fascist partisans); Egon von Neindorff, 51, German Major General (killed in action at Tarnopol); Nikolai Fyodorovich Vatutin, 42, Soviet military commander (killed in an ambush by the Ukrainian Insurgent Army)

== April 16, 1944 (Sunday) ==
- Soviet forces cleared out the last pockets of German resistance at Yalta.
- The RAF made air raids on Romania for the first time, from bases in Italy.
- German submarine U-550 was sunk in the Atlantic Ocean by American warships.

== April 17, 1944 (Monday) ==
- The Uman–Botoșani Offensive ended in Soviet victory.
- The Battle of Central Henan began between Chinese and Japanese forces in China.
- The Japanese Take Ichi convoy left Shanghai carrying two infantry divisions to reinforce Japanese positions in the Philippines and western New Guinea.
- German submarine U-342 was depth charged and sunk in the North Atlantic by a PBY Catalina flying boat of No. 162 Squadron RCAF.
- Died: J. T. Hearne, 76, English cricketer

== April 18, 1944 (Tuesday) ==
- The Allies dropped more than 4,000 tons of bombs over Germany, the highest single-day total of the war up to this time.
- The Soviet 4th Ukrainian Front captured Balaklava.
- The American submarine USS Gudgeon was bombed and sunk off Iwo Jima by a Japanese Mitsubishi G3M.
- Born: Charlie Tuna, radio personality and game show presenter, also born in Trieste was Duane d.Zigliotto a radio presenter with pseudonym Captain DdZ. (d. 2016)

== April 19, 1944 (Wednesday) ==
- Operation Ichi-Go, a series of three separate major battles between Chinese and Japanese forces, began during the Second Sino-Japanese War. The Battle of Changsha began.
- British launched Operation Cockpit - an air raid on Japanese-held Sabang, Indonesia, incurring heavy damage to the port facilities and airfield.
- The 1944 NFL draft was held in Philadelphia. The Boston Yanks selected Notre Dame quarterback Angelo Bertelli as the #1 overall pick.
- Gérard Côté won the Boston Marathon, finishing just 13 seconds ahead of Johnny Kelley.
- Born: James Heckman, economist and Nobel laureate, in Chicago, Illinois
- Died: Jimmie Noone, 48, American jazz clarinetist and bandleader

== April 20, 1944 (Thursday) ==
- The RAF set a new record for a single air raid, dropping 4,500 tons of bombs for Hitler's 55th birthday.
- The American destroyer Lansdale and the Liberty ship SS Paul Hamilton were sunk off Algiers by the Luftwaffe.
- Died: Elmer Gedeon, 27, American USAAF officer and one of only two major league baseball players killed in WWII (shot down over France)

== April 21, 1944 (Friday) ==
- During the Battle of Imphal, Japanese troops captured Crete West Hill.
- An Allied bombing raid on Paris killed 640 French.
- Charles de Gaulle, leader of the French provisional government in Algiers, issued a simple decree giving French women the right to vote.
- Died: Hans-Valentin Hube, 53, German general (plane crash)

== April 22, 1944 (Saturday) ==
- The Western New Guinea campaign began with the Allied execution of Operations Reckless and Persecution. Allied forces carried out landings at Aitape and the Hollandia on New Guinea. General Hatazō Adachi's 11,000-man garrison was ill-prepared and an American foothold was easily gained. The Battle of Hollandia began.
- The second wave of Mesovouno massacres was carried out by members of the Wehrmacht in Greece.
- German submarine U-311 was sunk in the North Atlantic by Canadian warships.
- A two-day meeting between Hitler and Benito Mussolini began at Schloss Klessheim near Salzburg, also attended by Joachim von Ribbentrop, Wilhelm Keitel, Rudolf Rahn and Karl Wolff on the German side and Serafino Mazzolini, Rodolfo Graziani, Filippo Anfuso and general Umberto Morera for the Italians. Mussolini and his delegation presented a list of problems the Italian Social Republic was having which they attributed to the lack of cooperation with German authorities, but the German delegation no longer respected Mussolini who by now resembled a shadow of his former self.
- In the Kingdom of Afghanistan, the government responds to a revolt by a Zadran tribal leader named Mazarak, driving Mazarak into the hills.
- "It's Love-Love-Love" by Guy Lombardo and His Orchestra topped the Billboard singles charts.
- Born: Steve Fossett, businessman and adventurer, in Jackson, Tennessee (d. 2007)

== April 23, 1944 (Sunday) ==
- Hollandia, New Guinea fell to the Americans without much fighting.
- Japanese destroyer Amagiri was sunk in the Makassar Strait by a naval mine.
- The Salzburg conference between Hitler and Mussolini concluded. A compromise was reached in which Mussolini agreed to continue permitting Italian troops to be trained in Germany, with the best fighters allowed to form the nucleus of the new National Republican Army.

== April 24, 1944 (Monday) ==
- The Finisterre Range campaign ended in Allied victory in New Guinea.
- Nazi occupation forces in Greece carried out the Pyrgoi massacre.
- An RAF raid reached Munich by encroaching on Swiss air space, thereby side-tracking the German air warning system.
- British forces carried out the successful Raid on Santorini in the Aegean Sea.
- Pietro Badoglio installed a new cabinet consisting of all six anti-Fascist parties.
- The Billy Wilder-directed film noir Double Indemnity starring Fred MacMurray and Barbara Stanwyck was released.
- Born: Tony Visconti, record producer, musician and singer, in Brooklyn, New York

== April 25, 1944 (Tuesday) ==
- Adolf Eichmann and the Nazis offered the Hungarian rescue worker Joel Brand the "Blood for Goods" deal, proposing that one million Jews be allowed to leave Hungary for any Allied-occupied country except Palestine, in exchange for goods obtained outside of Hungary. The deal would never be made because the Allies believed it to be a trick and the British press slammed it as blackmail.
- German submarine U-488 was depth charged and sunk in the Atlantic Ocean by U.S. warships.
- On Budget Day in the United Kingdom, Chancellor of the Exchequer Sir John Anderson announced that the deficit for the past year was £2.76 billion. This was £89 million smaller than the deficit forecast by Anderson's predecessor, the late Kingsley Wood, because government revenue was higher than expected. Anderson presented a budget with only minor changes from the previous year and no additional taxation.
- The United Negro College Fund was founded in the United States.
- Born: Len Goodman, ballroom dancer, dance judge and coach, in Wolverhampton, England (d. 2023)
- Died: George Herriman, 63, American cartoonist and creator of the Krazy Kat comic strip

== April 26, 1944 (Wednesday) ==
- Kidnap of Heinrich Kreipe: Two British officers disguised as German police abducted the German officer Heinrich Kreipe as he rode on his way to his residence outside Heraklion, Crete.
- American submarine USS Jack attacked the Take Ichi convoy and sank the freighter Yoshida Maru No.1, killing all 2,669 aboard.
- Action of 26 April 1944: A German torpedo boat was sunk in the English Channel off Jentilez by Allied destroyers.
- German submarine U-488 was depth charged and sunk west of the Cape Verde Islands by American warships.
- Japanese submarine I-180 was sunk off Chirikof Island by the U.S. destroyer escort Gilmore.
- Born: Larry H. Miller, businessman and philanthropist, in Salt Lake City, Utah (d. 2009)

== April 27, 1944 (Thursday) ==
- The British government banned all travel abroad.
- German submarine U-803 struck a mine and sank in the Baltic Sea off Swinemünde.
- The legislative assembly of the Canadian province of Quebec voted 55-4 to adopt a motion introduced by René Chaloult expressing disapproval of any attempt to send conscripted men overseas.
- Jim Tobin of the Boston Braves pitched a 2-0 no-hitter against the Brooklyn Dodgers. Tobin also hit a home run during the game, becoming the third pitcher in major league history to hit a home run while throwing a no-hitter.
- Born: Michael Fish, TV weatherman, in Eastbourne, Sussex, England; Cuba Gooding, Sr., lead singer of the soul group The Main Ingredient, in New York City (d. 2017)

== April 28, 1944 (Friday) ==
- The first practice assault in Exercise Tiger, a series of large-scale rehearsals for D-Day, was held on Slapton Sands in Devon. The exercise was attacked by nine German E-boats that killed a total of 749 American servicemen. Two landing ships were sunk including USS LST-507.
- Japanese cruiser Yūbari sank southwest of Palau the day after being torpedoed by the American submarine Bluegill.
- Died: Frank Knox, 70, American newspaper editor, publisher and Secretary of the U.S. Navy

== April 29, 1944 (Saturday) ==
- In one of the worst friendly fire incidents of the war, Motor Torpedo Boat PT-346 was attacked off Rabaul by two American Marine Corsair planes that mistook two PT boats for Japanese gunboats. PT-346 was destroyed with nine men killed and nine wounded.
- American attacks on the Japanese air base at Truk destroyed most of the aircraft.
- The Canadian destroyer HMCS Athabaskan was torpedoed and sunk in the English Channel by the German torpedo boat T24.
- Japanese submarine I-183 was sunk south of the Bungo Strait by American submarine Pogy.
- German submarine U-421 was bombed and sunk at the military port of Toulon by an American air raid.
- Born: Richard Kline, actor and television director, in Queens, New York
- Died: Billy Bitzer, 70, American cinematographer; Bernardino Machado, 93, two-time President of Portugal

== April 30, 1944 (Sunday) ==
- A U.S. task force of nine heavy cruisers and eight destroyers bombarded Japanese positions on Satawan.
- The first of 500,000 prefabricated homes went on show in London.
- Born: Jill Clayburgh, actress, in New York City (d. 2010)
- Died: Paul Poiret, 65, French fashion designer
