= List of massacres in the Italian Social Republic =

This is a list of notable massacres in the Italian Social Republic. German troops in Italy often massacred civilians in retaliation for partisan activity.

To a lesser extent, war crimes were committed by the National Republican Army (fascist Italian army), usually against Italian partisans, such as at the Salussola massacre, where 20 partisans were executed. Partisans, in retaliation, sometimes also massacred captured Fascist soldiers, like at the Rovetta massacre.

== List of massacres ==
A list of massacres of either more than 100 victims or international notability:

Name	Date	Location	Deaths	Perpetrators	Notes
Lake Maggiore massacres	September & October 1943	Lago Maggiore	56	1st SS Panzer Division	Murder of 56 predominantly Italian Jews despite strict German orders not to carry out any violence against civilians, also noted for the controversial court case in West Germany in the late 1960s.
Boves massacre	19 September 1943	Boves	23	1st SS Panzer Division	Massacre of 23 civilians in retaliation of the capture of two German soldiers despite the two having been freed in exchange for the promise that no reprisal against civilians would be carried out. Sometimes incorrectly referred to as the first German massacre in Italy during the war.
Caiazzo massacre	13 October 1943	Caiazzo	22	3rd Panzergrenadier Division	Massacre of 22 civilians, noted for its brutality and the controversial court case involving the main perpetrator 50 years later.
Pisino massacre	14 October 1943	Pazin (now part of Croatia)	157	1st SS Panzer Division	Anti-partisan operations with aircraft, tanks and ground forces.
Pietransieri massacre	21 November 1943	Pietransieri	125	1st Parachute Division	Mass killing of civilians with explosives after the inhabitants of Pietransieri had refused the order to leave the area and remained in the vicinity of the village.
Monchio, Susano and Costrignano massacre	18 March 1944	Palagano	130	1st Fallschirm-Panzer Division Hermann Göring	Anti-partisan operation in response to increased partisan activity in the area. German troops and their Fascist Italian allies burn villages and indiscriminately execute the male population.
Ardeatine massacre	24 March 1944	Rome	335	Schutzstaffel	Reprisal for a partisan attack conducted on the previous day in central Rome against the SS Police Regiment Bozen (SD-Gestapo led by Herbert Kappler).
Operation Ginny II massacre	26 March 1944	Ameglia	15	135th (Fortress) Brigade of the Wehrmacht	Execution of 15 captured American saboteurs under Hitler's Commando Order. The Americans were in proper uniform and their execution was in violation of established international law. The execution was carried out on the order of General Anton Dostler. His adjutant Alexander zu Dohna-Schlobitten refused to sign the execution order and was dismissed for insubordination. After the war, Dostler was tried at Nuremberg for war crimes, found guilty, and executed.
Fragheto massacre	7–8 April 1944	near Casteldelci	53	Sturmbattaillon OB Sudwest of the 356th Infantry Division and the Venezia-Giulia Battalion of the National Republican Guard	After partisans belonging to the Eighth Garibaldi Brigade ambushed troops approaching the hamlet of Fragheto on 7 April, soldiers of the Sturmbattaillon OB Sudwest conducted house-to-house searches and summarily killed 30 civilians and 15 partisans. Many of the civilians were elderly people, women, or children. A further seven partisans and one civilian were shot the next day.
Vallucciole massacre	13 April 1944	Stia	107	1st Fallschirm-Panzer Division Hermann Göring	In response to increased partisan activity in the area German troops and their Fascist Italian allies execute a policy of scorched earth by burning villages, raping women and indiscriminately executing civilians to discourage resistance.
Lipa massacre	30 April 1944	Matulji (now part of Croatia)	269	SS Volunteer Karstwehr Battalion	Mass killing of civilians by German occupation troops
Civitella in Val di Chiana massacre	29 June 1944	Civitella in Val di Chiana	146	1st Fallschirm-Panzer Division Hermann Göring	Anti-partisan operation in retaliation to the killing of German soldiers, where all men in the affected villages were indiscriminately rounded up and executed while the women and children were allowed to leave, except in the village of Cornia, where the original partisan attack took place and women and children are executed as well.
Cavriglia massacre	4 July 1944	Cavriglia	173	1st Fallschirm-Panzer Division Hermann Göring	Anti-partisan operation where all men in the affected villages were indiscriminately rounded up and executed while the women and children were allowed to leave.
Sant'Anna di Stazzema massacre	12 August 1944	Sant'Anna di Stazzema	560	16th SS Panzergrenadier Division 36th Brigata Nera	Mass killing of civilians by German occupation troops and Italian collaborators (16th Brigade)
San Terenzo Monti massacre	17–19 August 1944	Fivizzano	159	16th SS Panzergrenadier Division	Anti-partisan operation in retaliation to the killing of 16 German soldiers. Execution of captured partisans and destruction of local villages and execution of the inhabitants.
Padule di Fucecchio massacre	23 August 1944	Padule di Fucecchio	184	26th Panzer Division	Up to 184 Italian civilians as a reprisal for a partisan attack on two German soldiers
Vinca massacre	24–27 August 1944	Fivizzano	162	16th SS Panzergrenadier Division	Anti-partisan operation in retaliation to the killing of a German officer. Destruction of local villages and execution of the inhabitants, mostly women, children and elderly who had been unable to escape.
San Leonardo al Frigido massacre	16 September 1944	Massa	149	16th SS Panzergrenadier Division	Unprovoked mass execution of prison inmates, most of them serving time for minor offences.
Marzabotto massacre	29 September 1944	Marzabotto	770	16th SS Panzergrenadier Division	Mass killing of civilians by German occupation troops
San Martino di Lupari massacre	29 April 1945	San Martino di Lupari	125	29th Panzergrenadier Division	Retreating north in the Province of Padua, under attack by the US Army and Italian partisans, the division randomly executed civilians, took hostages and used them as human shields.

== See also ==
- List of massacres in Italy
- German war crimes in Italy during World War II
