= May 1944 =

Month of 1944

<<	May 1944					>>
Su	Mo	Tu	We	Th	Fr	Sa
	1	2	3	4	5	6
7	8	9	10	11	12	13
14	15	16	17	18	19	20
21	22	23	24	25	26	27
28	29	30	31

The following events occurred in May 1944:

== May 1, 1944 (Monday) ==
- German submarine U-277 was depth charged and sunk in the Arctic Ocean by a Fairey Swordfish aircraft of 842 Naval Air Squadron.
- 1 May 1944 Kaisariani executions: 200 Greek communists were executed by Nazi occupation authorities in the Athens suburb of Kaisariani as reprisal for the killing of a German general by Greek Resistance fighters.
- Born: Suresh Kalmadi, politician and senior sports administrator, in Pune, British India (d. 2026)
- Died: Itzhak Katzenelson, 57, Polish-Jewish teacher, poet and dramatist (killed at Auschwitz)

== May 2, 1944 (Tuesday) ==
- The Second Battle of Târgu Frumos began on the Eastern Front.
- German submarine U-674 was sunk in the Arctic Ocean north of Tromsø by a Fairey Swordfish aircraft of 842 Naval Air Squadron.
- The American destroyer USS Parrott was severely damaged in a collision with the Liberty ship John Morton at Norfolk, Virginia and never repaired.
- Spain bowed to pressure from the Allies and agreed to stop exporting tungsten to Germany.
- The first two transports of Hungarian Jews arrived at Auschwitz concentration camp.

== May 3, 1944 (Wednesday) ==
- Soemu Toyoda was made Commander in Chief of the Combined Fleet, replacing Mineichi Koga who was killed March 31.
- The American destroyer escort USS Donnell was torpedoed and heavily damaged in the Atlantic Ocean by German submarine U-473. Donnell was towed to Scotland and declared a total loss.
- German submarine U-852 was beached and scuttled on the Somali coast after being heavily damaged by British aircraft.

== May 4, 1944 (Thursday) ==
- German submarine U-371 was scuttled off Constantine, Algeria after being heavily damaged by Allied warships.
- German submarine U-846 was depth charged and sunk in the Bay of Biscay by a Vickers Wellington of 407 Squadron, Royal Canadian Air Force.
- The mystery-thriller film Gaslight starring Charles Boyer, Ingrid Bergman, Joseph Cotten and Angela Lansbury (in her film debut) premiered in New York City.
- Born: Fred Stanfield, ice hockey player, in Toronto, Canada (d. 2021); Russi Taylor, voice actress, in Cambridge, Massachusetts (d. 2019)

== May 5, 1944 (Friday) ==
- The British Fourteenth Army counterattacked during the Battle of Imphal.
- After almost two years of internment in the Aga Khan's palace in Pune, Mahatma Gandhi was released for medical reasons. It would prove to be the last internment of Gandhi's life.
- Born: Roger Rees, actor and director, in Aberystwyth, Wales (d. 2015); John Rhys-Davies, actor, in Salisbury, England
- Died: Bertha Benz, 95, German automotive pioneer and wife of Karl Benz

== May 6, 1944 (Saturday) ==
- Soviet forces began their final attack on Sevastopol with a massive artillery bombardment.
- The Biltmore Conference opened at the Biltmore Hotel in New York City, with 600 delegates and Zionist leaders attending to discuss an official Zionist policy on the Jews and Palestine.
- British authorities announced that Mahatma Gandhi had been unconditionally released from custody on medical grounds after being interned at Aga Khan III's palace at Pune since August 1942.
- The Japanese Mitsubishi A7M fighter plane had its first flight, but only nine would ever be manufactured.
- American submarine USS Gurnard attacked the Take Ichi convoy and sank three freighters.
- German submarine U-473 was sunk in the Atlantic Ocean southwest of Ireland by British sloops.
- German submarine U66 was rammed and sunk by the USS Buckley (DE-51) off Cape Verde.
- Pensive won the Kentucky Derby.
- "I Love You" by Bing Crosby topped the Billboard singles charts.

== May 7, 1944 (Sunday) ==
- The U.S. Eighth Air Force conducted a massive 1,500 bomber raid on Berlin.
- The Canadian frigate Valleyfield was torpedoed and sunk southeast of Cape Race, Newfoundland by German submarine U-548 with the loss of 129 of 167 crew.
- Died: William Ledyard Rodgers, 84, American admiral

== May 8, 1944 (Monday) ==
- The Second Battle of Târgu Frumos ended in Axis victory.
- The Czechoslovak government-in-exile signed a convention in London allowing the Soviet Army to liberate Czechoslovakia.
- Born: Gary Glitter, glam rock musician, in Banbury, Oxfordshire, England
- Died: Ethel Smyth, 86, English composer and suffragist

== May 9, 1944 (Tuesday) ==
- The Soviet 4th Ukrainian Front captured Sevastopol.
- Andrés Ignacio Menéndez became President of El Salvador after Maximiliano Hernández Martínez fled the country.
- The Manhattan Ear, Nose and Throat and New York Hospitals opened the world's first eye bank.
- Born: Richie Furay, musician (Buffalo Springfield, Poco) in Yellow Springs, Ohio; Laurence Owen, figure skater, in Oakland, California (d. 1961)

== May 10, 1944 (Wednesday) ==
- Soviet General Aleksandr Vasilevsky was wounded in the head at Sevastopol after his car drove over a mine. He was evacuated to Moscow for treatment.
- Japanese destroyer Karukaya was sunk in the South China Sea by the American submarine Cod.
- Born: Jim Abrahams, film director and writer, in Shorewood, Wisconsin (d. 2024)

== May 11, 1944 (Thursday) ==
- U.S. and British forces carried out Operation Diadem in Italy, breaking through German defenses in the Liri Valley.
- Allied forces raided airfields and coastal installations in Normandy, hitting Calais particularly hard as part of the deception plan to make the Germans think the landings would be made there.
- The wartime romance film The White Cliffs of Dover starring Irene Dunne and Alan Marshal was released.

== May 12, 1944 (Friday) ==
- The two-year Battle of the Caucasus ended in Soviet victory.
- 19-year old Indian Sepoy Kamal Ram earned the Victoria Cross for his actions during his battalion's assault on the Gustav Line in Italy. Ram wiped out a German machine-gun post single-handedly, induced a second one to surrender and then assisted a companion in destroying a third.
- Born: Sara Kestelman, actress, in London, England
- Died: Max Brand, 51, American author; Harold Lowe, 61, British sailor and Fifth Officer of the RMS Titanic; Arthur Quiller-Couch, 80, Cornish author and literary critic

== May 13, 1944 (Saturday) ==
- The Battle of the Tennis Court ended in Allied victory.
- Action of 13 May 1944: A U.S. destroyer escort sank the former German U-boat U-1224, which had been given to the Japanese Navy and renamed RO-501. It was the first of two times a Japanese ship was sunk in the Atlantic Ocean during the war.
- The Germans completed their withdrawal from the Crimea, having evacuated more than 150,000 men by air and sea over several weeks.
- Near Cassino, Italy, British Captain Richard Wakeford killed a number of the enemy and took 20 prisoners while armed with only a revolver. The following day he organized and led a force to attack a hill despite taking wounds to his face, arms and legs. Wakeford would be awarded the Victoria Cross for his actions.
- Pensive won the Preakness Stakes.
- Born: Armistead Maupin, novelist, in Washington, D.C.

== May 14, 1944 (Sunday) ==
- Japanese destroyer Inazuma was torpedoed and sunk in the Celebes Sea off Tawi-Tawi by the American submarine Bonefish.
- Men of the 21st Waffen Mountain Division of the SS Skanderbeg (1st Albanian) rounded up 281 Kosovo Jews in Pristina and handed them over to the Germans for deportation to the Bergen-Belsen concentration camp.
- Vichy radio reported that French cardinals had appealed to the Roman Catholic clergy in Britain and the United States to use their influence to ensure that the French civilian population as well as towns, works of art and churches would be spared from Allied bombing as much as possible.
- Strange Fruit by Lillian Smith hit #1 on the New York Times Fiction Best Sellers list.
- Born: George Lucas, filmmaker, entrepreneur and creator of the Star Wars and Indiana Jones franchises, in Modesto, California

== May 15, 1944 (Monday) ==
- The Battle of Wakde began in Netherlands New Guinea.
- The first of three days of British Commando reconnaissance raids known as Operation Tarbrush began in northern France.
- Hungarian officials under the guidance of SS officials began deporting Jews from Hungary. By July 9 a total of about 440,000 Jews would be deported from the country, mostly to Auschwitz.
- In Algiers, French Vice-Admiral Edmond Derrien was sentenced to life in prison for handing over units of the French Fleet to the Germans in December 1942, after the Allied landing in North Africa.
- German submarine U-731 was depth charged and sunk in the Atlantic Ocean by Allied planes and warships.
- Clyde Shoun of the Cincinnati Reds pitched a 1-0 no-hitter against the Boston Braves.
- Born: Ulrich Beck, sociologist, in Stolp, Germany (d. 2015); Gunilla Hutton, actress and singer, in Gothenburg, Sweden

== May 16, 1944 (Tuesday) ==
- Japanese submarine I-176 was depth charged and sunk off Buka Island by three American destroyers.
- German submarine U-616 was damaged in the Mediterranean Sea east of Cartagena, Spain by American warships. She was consequently scuttled the next day.
- Died: George Ade, 78, American writer, newspaper columnist and playwright; Filip Mișea, Aromanian activist, physician and politician

== May 17, 1944 (Wednesday) ==
- The Siege of Myitkyina began during the Burma Campaign.
- German submarine U-240 went missing in the North Sea. Her fate remains unknown.

== May 18, 1944 (Thursday) ==
- The Battle of Monte Cassino ended after 123 days in Allied victory when the Germans finally abandoned the stronghold at Monte Cassino.
- The Admiralty Islands campaign ended after 80 days with a decisive Allied victory.
- The Battle of Wakde ended in American victory.
- Hitler assigned Gerd von Runstedt as Commander in Chief of German forces in the west.
- Joseph Stalin ordered the deportation of the Crimean Tatars as a form of collective punishment for alleged collaboration with the Nazis.
- Born: Albert Hammond, singer, songwriter and record producer, in London, England

== May 19, 1944 (Friday) ==
- German submarine U-960 was sunk in the Mediterranean by Allied planes and warships.
- The Republican Party presidential primaries ended in the United States with New York Governor Thomas E. Dewey prevailing in Oregon.
- Died: Amirkhan Tleumagambetov, 36, Kazakh collaborator in the Turkestan Legion.

== May 20, 1944 (Saturday) ==
- U.S. troops captured the Italian cities of Gaeta and Itri.
- 80 miles east of Warsaw, the Polish Resistance recovered a German V-2 rocket, dismantled it and sent it to London for analysis.
- The Communist Party USA convention in New York voted to dissolve the party and continue as the Communist Political Association.
- Born: Joe Cocker, singer and musician, in Sheffield, England (d. 2014); Boudewijn de Groot, singer and songwriter, in a Japanese concentration camp in Batavia, Dutch East Indies; Dietrich Mateschitz, businessman and co-founder of the Red Bull energy drink company, in Sankt Marein im Mürztal, Austria (d. 2022)
- Died: Fraser Barron, 23, New Zealand aviator (plane crash at Le Mans, France); Vincent Rose, 63, Italian-born American violinist, composer and bandleader

== May 21, 1944 (Sunday) ==
- The West Loch disaster occurred at the U.S. Naval Base in Pearl Harbor when a mortar round detonated aboard the LST-353, starting a fire that spread among ships being prepared for Operation Forager, the invasion of the Mariana Islands. Six LSTs were sunk and 163 naval personnel were killed.
- Judge Learned Hand delivers his short speech,‘’The Spirit of Liberty,’’before 1.5 million people on ‘’I Am an American Day’’ in Central Park. “The spirit of liberty is the spirit which is not too sure that it is right; the spirit of liberty is the spirit which seeks to understand the minds of other men and women; the spirit of liberty is the spirit which weighs their interests alongside its own without bias. . .”
- German submarine U-453 was depth charged and sunk in the Ionian Sea by British warships.
- Born: Mary Robinson, 7th President of Ireland, in Ballina, County Mayo, Ireland

== May 22, 1944 (Monday) ==
- Japanese destroyer Asanagi was torpedoed and sunk northwest of Chichijima by American submarine Pollack.
- Japanese submarine Ro-106 was hedgehogged and sunk north of the Admiralty Islands by American destroyer escort USS England.
- This week's issue of Life magazine published a photo of a young American woman with a Japanese skull sent to her by her boyfriend in the U.S. Navy. Letters sent to the magazine widely condemned the publishing of the photo, and the Army directed its bureau of Public Relations to inform U.S. publishers that "the publication of such stories would be likely to encourage the enemy to take reprisals against American dead and prisoners of war."

== May 23, 1944 (Tuesday) ==
- Allied forces began a new offensive from the Anzio beachhead. French troops took Pico while the Americans took Lenola.
- A four-day constitutional referendum ended in Iceland. More than 98% of voters approved of the founding of the Republic of Iceland.
- Born: John Newcombe, tennis player, in Sydney, Australia; Avraham Oz, theatre director, professor and peace activist, in Tel Aviv

== May 24, 1944 (Wednesday) ==
- Allied forces breached the Hitler Line in central Italy.
- Canadian troops in the Liri Valley took Pontecorvo.
- German submarine U-476 was depth charged and damaged off Trondheim by a PBY Catalina of No. 210 Squadron RAF. She was scuttled the next day by U-990, which rescued the survivors.
- German submarine U-675 was depth charged and sunk off Ålesund by a Short Sunderland patrol bomber of No. 4 Squadron RAF.
- Born: David Mark Berger, Olympic weightlifter, in Cleveland, Ohio (d. 1972); Patti LaBelle, singer, author and actress, in Philadelphia, Pennsylvania
- Died: Inigo Campioni, 65, Italian naval officer (executed by firing squad for refusing to collaborate with the Italian Social Republic); Matsuji Ijuin, 51, Japanese naval officer (killed when his flagship, the patrol boat Iki, was torpedoed and sunk north of Saipan); Luigi Mascherpa, 51, Italian admiral (executed for refusing to collaborate with the Italian Social Republic); Harold Bell Wright, 72, American writer

== May 25, 1944 (Thursday) ==
- The Battle of Central Henan in China ended in Japanese victory.
- Axis forces including the German XV Mountain Corps began Operation Rösselsprung, a combined airborne and ground assault on the headquarters of the Yugoslav Partisans in the Bosnian town of Drvar.
- The U.S. Fifth Army linked up with the Anzio beachhead and captured Cisterna.
- German submarine U-990 was depth charged and sunk in the North Sea by a B-24 Liberator of No. 59 Squadron RAF.
- Born: Frank Oz, puppeteer and filmmaker, in Hereford, England
- Died: Clark Daniel Stearns, 74, 9th Governor of American Samoa

== May 26, 1944 (Friday) ==
- Allied forces continued to advance toward Rome as American troops took Cori, the Canadians captured San Giovanni and the British took Monte Cairo.
- 717 French were killed by an Allied bombing raid on Lyon.

== May 27, 1944 (Saturday) ==
- The Battle of Biak began as part of the New Guinea campaign.
- German submarine U-292 was depth charged and sunk west of Trondheim by a B-24 Liberator of No. 59 Squadron RAF.
- Born: Chris Dodd, politician, in Willimantic, Connecticut

== May 28, 1944 (Sunday) ==
- I Canadian Corps took Ceprano.
- Born: Rudy Giuliani, lawyer, businessman and 107th Mayor of New York City, in Brooklyn, New York; Gladys Knight, singer, songwriter and actress, in Atlanta, Georgia; Sondra Locke, actress and director, in Shelbyville, Tennessee (d. 2018); Rita MacNeil, country and folk singer, in Big Pond, Nova Scotia, Canada (d. 2013); Patricia Quinn, actress, in Belfast, Northern Ireland; Gary Stewart, singer, in Jenkins, Kentucky (d. 2003); Billy Vera, musician, in Riverside, California

== May 29, 1944 (Monday) ==
- The Germans called off Operation Steinbock after four months of strategically bombing southern England accomplished little effect.
- German submarine U-549 was depth charged and sunk in the Atlantic Ocean by American warships.
- The American escort carrier USS Block Island was torpedoed and sunk off the Canary Islands by German submarine U-549.
- Born: Helmut Berger, actor, in Bad Ischl, Austria (d. 2023)

== May 30, 1944 (Tuesday) ==
- The British Eighth Army took Arce.
- The Caesar Line was breached by the U.S. Fifth Army
- A general election was held in Ireland. Éamon de Valera's Fianna Fáil won re-election and an overall majority.
- Princess Charlotte of Monaco resigned her rights to the throne in favor of her son Prince Rainier.
- Born: Meredith MacRae, actress and singer, in Houston, Texas (d. 2000)
- Died: Jessie Ralph, 79, American stage and screen actress

== May 31, 1944 (Wednesday) ==
- The Government of India announced the formation of a Department of Planning and Development to plan for the postwar period.
- German submarine U-289 was depth charged and sunk in the Barents Sea by British destroyer HMS Milne.
