= 356th Division =

356th Division may refer to:

- 356th Infantry Division, Wehrmacht, Germany
- 356th Rifle Division, Soviet Union

== See also ==
- List of military divisions by number
