= Fragheto massacre =

World War II massacre near Casteldelci, Italy

- Part of World War II
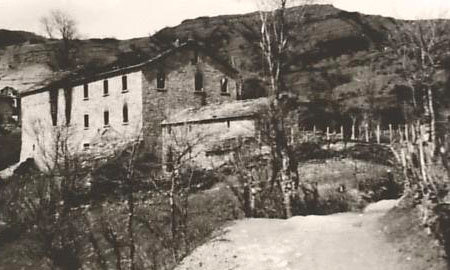
- The central street of Fragheto after the massacre; traces of flames are visible above the windows of the house on the left
- Location: 43°48′35.64″N 12°8′50.96″E; Fragheto, Casteldelci, Italian Social Republic
- Date: 7 April 1944 – 8 April 1944
- Attack type: Massacre
- Deaths: Fragheto: 30 civilians; 15 partisans; Ponte Carrattoni: 1 civilian; 7 partisans
- Injuries: 3 civilians
- Perpetrators: Sturmbattaillon OB Sudwest, 356th Infantry Division; Venezia-Giulia Battalion, National Republican Guard
- Motive: Reprisal for an ambush on German soldiers by partisans and regional partisan activity

The Fragheto massacre (Italian: Eccidio di Fragheto or Strage di Fragheto) was the massacre of 30 Italian civilians and 15 partisans in Fragheto, a frazione of Casteldelci in central-northern Italy, (Note: On 17 December 2006, voters in Casteldelci voted to join the region of Emilia-Romagna. Thus, on 15 August 2009, Fragheto was transferred from the province of Pesaro and Urbino in the Marche to the province of Rimini, which had been formed on 16 April 1992, in the region of Emilia-Romagna.) on 7 April 1944, during World War II, by soldiers of the German 356th Infantry Division. After partisans belonging to the Eighth Garibaldi Brigade ambushed troops approaching the hamlet, fourteen soldiers of the Sturmbattaillon OB Sudwest conducted house-to-house searches and summarily killed civilians. Representing 40% of the hamlet's population, many of the victims were elderly people, women, or children. A further seven partisans and one civilian were shot the next day at Ponte Carrattoni, at the confluence of the Senatello and Marecchia.

The Fragheto massacre was among the first massacres perpetrated by the Wehrmacht and collaborating Italian fascists in central-northern Italy. For years after the massacre, some local opinion held partisans responsible for the massacre, accusing them of attempting an impossible ambush and leaving the hamlet's residents open to reprisal.

An initial investigation into the massacre was archived in the 1960s, the files being lost in the Armadio della vergogna. In 2013, a trial in absentia acquitted the only two surviving German soldiers, who had been charged with multiple homicide aggravated by trivial reasons.

== Background ==
In early 1944, partisans active in central-northern Italy were disrupting the construction of the Gothic Line. On 2 April 1944, five detachments of the Eighth Garibaldi Brigade, who were partisans aligned with the Italian Communist Party, occupied Sant'Agata Feltria. They captured forty-two soldiers of the Italian Social Republic, carabinieri, and policemen.

With supporting Italian fascist forces, a German detachment was sent to round up partisans in the area between Monte Fumaiolo and Casteldelci. On 6 April, troops belonging to the Sturmbattaillon OB Sudwest of the 356th Infantry Division passed through Capanne di Verghereto. At an infirmary in the town, they killed three wounded partisans, and captured eight young people as prisoners, of whom seven were partisans and one was a civilian. The prisoners, who were seriously ill, were forced to carry cases of ammunition.

To escape encirclement, partisans in the area headed towards Fragheto. On the night of 6–7 April, the first company of the partisan brigade, led by Alberto Bardi, sheltered in the hamlet of Fragheto. In the morning, they decided to engage the German troops approaching the hamlet, thereby delaying their advance and allowing other companies time to escape. The company climbed the hills near Calanco and ambushed the Germans. The ambush killed three partisans and several Germans.

The partisans retreated from their positions at approximately 13:00, ending the ambush. In the houses at Calanco di Sotto, the Germans killed six partisans aged between 21 and 24. The German forces continued towards the Senatello, stopping to search houses for partisans. Being warned by partisans of an imminent incursion, the young men of Fragheto fled the hamlet, while the women and children stayed, believing the Germans would only target men of military age. By attacking the hills, the partisans hoped the hamlet would be spared any reprisal.

== Massacre ==
Arriving in Fragheto at 17:30 that afternoon, fourteen soldiers of the Sturmbattaillon OB Sudwest raided the hamlet, conducting house-to-house searches and summarily killing civilians inside. The soldiers believed that the hamlet was a partisan base: according to testimonies, they had found a wounded partisan in the first house they searched, while in another, an Italian civilian opened fire on two soldiers.

Of the hamlet's 71 inhabitants, 30 were killed, including 15 women, one of whom was pregnant, seven children, six elderly people, and two young adults. Three people were injured. 15 partisans were also killed, including five partisans who had been captured in previous days. The hamlet's houses and church rectory were set alight. For unknown reasons, one house in the hamlet was spared: 29 residents sheltered in that house.

All the while, the Sturmbattalion was transporting the eight prisoners they had captured in Capanne. Though the Germans wanted to transfer them to Germany as prisoners, the Italians demanded their death. After spending the night of 7–8 April at the confluence of the Senatello and Marecchia, a soldier of the Venezia-Giulia Battalion of the National Republican Guard executed the prisoners using a machine gun. Before their deaths, their heads were shaved in humiliation by bayonet. Thirty minutes after the execution, one of the prisoners resurfaced, kissed his comrades, and begged the German soldiers not to be executed. Noticed by the Italians, he was again shot by machine gun, and grenades were launched on the victims' corpses.

One of the residents who survived the massacre, 21-year-old Leone Cresti, hid in a cave 100 metres (330 ft) from the hamlet. Among the first to return to the hamlet, Cresti helped to collect the bodies and dig the mass grave in which they were buried.

== Investigations and trial ==
A trial of fascist collaborators opened in Pesaro in 1947. In the 1960s, it was archived after a preliminary investigation, and the files were lost in the Armadio della vergogna, which was rediscovered in 1994. On 10 March 1950, Perugia's Court of Assizes suspended the prosecution of three Italians suspected of having collaborated in the massacre "because the crimes have been extinguished by virtue of amnesty".

While one of the soldiers responsible for the execution of the eight prisoners at the confluence was initially sentenced to imprisonment for thirty years, the sentence was later overturned.

In 2006, the military prosecutor's office of La Spezia reopened the case, and Interpol later identified the German soldiers involved. The case passed to the office of Verona following the suppression of the La Spezia office. From 20 January 2012, the only three surviving German officers were tried in absentia on grounds of multiple homicide aggravated by trivial reasons. On 7 February 2013, the military court of Verona acquitted two defendants and did not return a verdict on the third, who had died during the trial. The ruling was upheld in 2014 at Rome's military court of appeal.

== Commemoration ==
Some local opinion placed responsibility for the massacre on the partisans, accusing them of attempting an impossible ambush and leaving the hamlet open to reprisals. Adolfo Bernardi, the parish priest, popularised blame for the partisans; Bernardi himself was spared from the massacre, along with an altar-server, because they had been blessing houses for Easter. Florestano Vancini's 1980 documentary Fragheto, una strage: perché? (transl. Fragheto, a Massacre: Why?) interviewed survivors, attempting to reconcile their memories.

The massacre is remembered annually at an event organised each 7 April by Casteldelci's municipal council. A plaque in Fragheto commemorates the massacre, as well as a monument in the hamlet's cemetery. A section of the memorial plaque to the war dead in Pesaro's Piazzale Collenuccio is dedicated to the massacre, and a street in the city is named "Martyrs of Fragheto" (Via Martiri di Fragheto). A local history walk includes signposted plaques at various notable points of the massacre. The bridge at the confluence of the Senatello and Marecchia, at the time named Ponte Carrattoni, was renamed the Bridge of the Eight Martyrs (Ponte degli Otto Martiri).

By presidential decree, on 9 April 2003, the municipality of Casteldelci was awarded the Silver Medal for Civil Valour (Medaglia d’argento al merito civile), with the motivation:

A small town, during the last world war, having provided temporary hospitality to a group of partisans, was subjected to a ferocious and blind reprisal by German troops, who massacred thirty of its citizens, mostly elderly people, women and children, and destroyed the entire town.

The Fragheto massacre inspired the foundation of two local civic associations: Casa Fragheto in Fragheto in 2000 and Il Borgo della Pace in Novafeltria in 2003. In 2017, Il Borgo della Pace sponsored a short film by Roberta Corsi and Fabio Imola that retold the story of the massacre. Museums in Fragheto and Casteldelci collect survivors' testimonies. On 20 August 2022, a plaque in Fragheto was unveiled to Maria and Candido Gabrielli, who raised awareness of the massacre during their lives; Candido was the only survivor of his family. An elementary school in Casteldelci is named after another Maria Gabrielli who died in the massacre.

== See also ==
- Axis war crimes in Italy
- List of massacres in the Italian Social Republic
