= Casteldelci =

- Comune
- Comune di Casteldelci
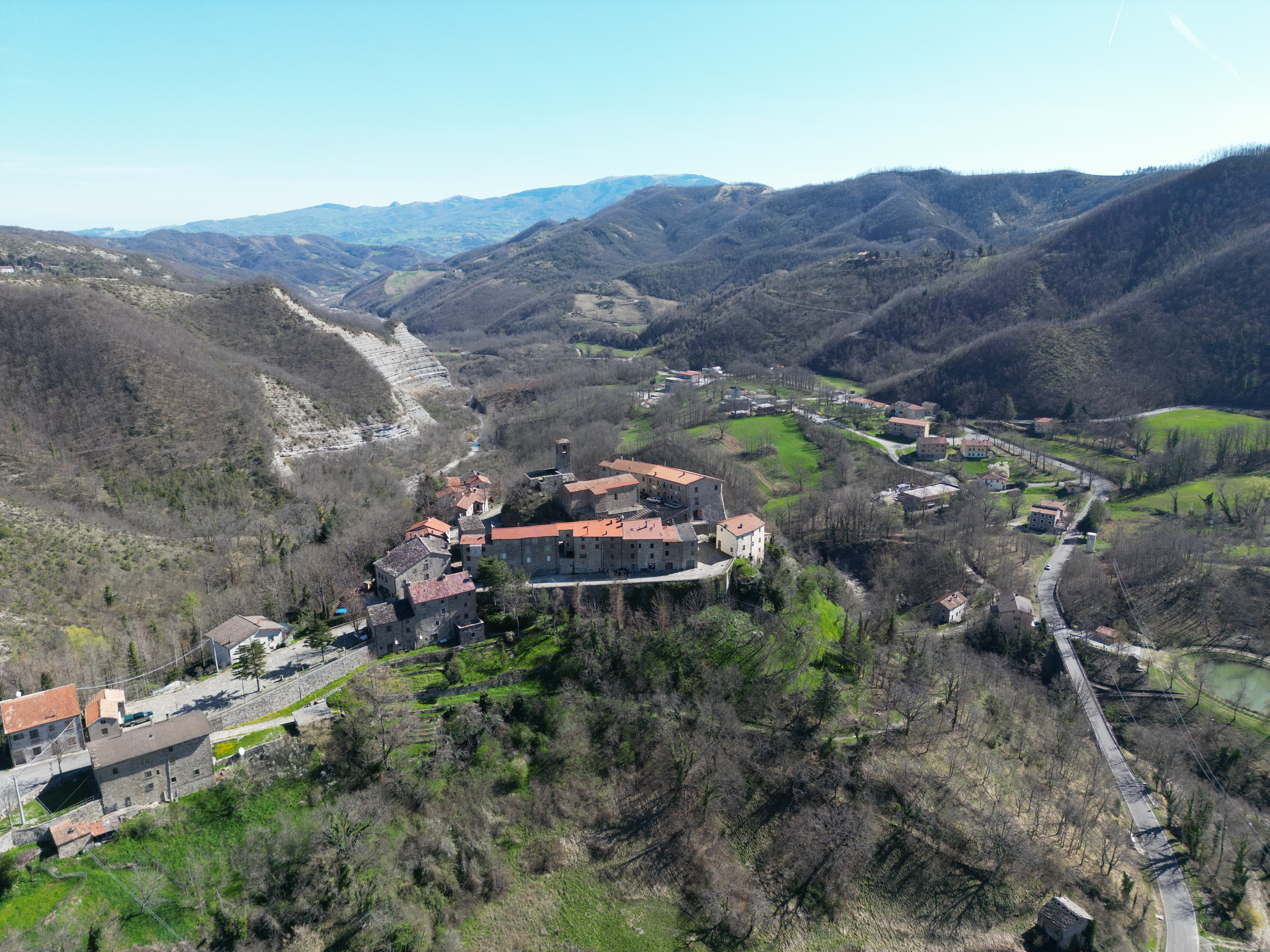
- View of Casteldelci

- Location within Italy Location within Emilia-Romagna
- Coordinates: 43°47′N 12°9′E
- Country: Italy
- Region: Emilia-Romagna
- Province: Rimini (RN)
- Frazioni: Fragheto, Giardiniera, Mercato, Monte, Poggio Ancisa, Schigno, Senatello

Government
  - Mayor: Marina Brizzi

Area
  - Total: 49.1 km^{2} (19.0 sq mi)
- Elevation: 632 m (2,073 ft)

Population (2006)
  - Total: 490
  - Density: 10/km^{2} (26/sq mi)
- Demonym: Castellani
- Time zone: UTC+1 (CET)
  - Summer (DST): UTC+2 (CEST)
- Postal code: 47861
- Dialing code: 0541-915423
- Patron saint: St. Martin
- Saint day: 11 November
- Website: Official website

Casteldelci (Romagnol: Castèl) is a comune (municipality) in the province of Rimini, in the Italian region of Emilia-Romagna, located about 140 kilometres (87 mi) southeast of Bologna and about 55 kilometres (34 mi) southwest of Rimini.

== History ==
On 7 April 1944, the hamlet of Fragheto was the site of the Fragheto massacre. After partisans belonging to the Eighth Garibaldi Brigade ambushed troops approaching the hamlet, fourteen soldiers of the German 356th Infantry Division conducted house-to-house searches and summarily killed civilians. 30 Italian civilians and 15 partisans were killed. Representing 40% of the hamlet's population, many of the victims were elderly people, women, or children. A further seven partisans and one civilian were shot the next day at Ponte Carrattoni, at the confluence of the Senatello and Marecchia.

On 17 and 18 December 2006, voters in Casteldelci voted to join the region of Emilia-Romagna. Of 448 eligible voters in Casteldelci, 232 (81.4%) voted to join Emilia-Romagna, while 53 (18.6%) voted to stay in the Marche region. Thus, on 15 August 2009, Casteldelci was transferred from the province of Pesaro and Urbino in the Marche to the province of Rimini, which had been formed on 16 April 1992, in the region of Emilia-Romagna.

== Personalities ==
It is the birthplace of the condottiero Uguccione della Faggiola, member of the family who ruled here in the Middle Ages. Later Casteldelci was a possession of the House of Montefeltro and the Medici.
