= USS Gurnard (SS-254) =

Submarine of the United States

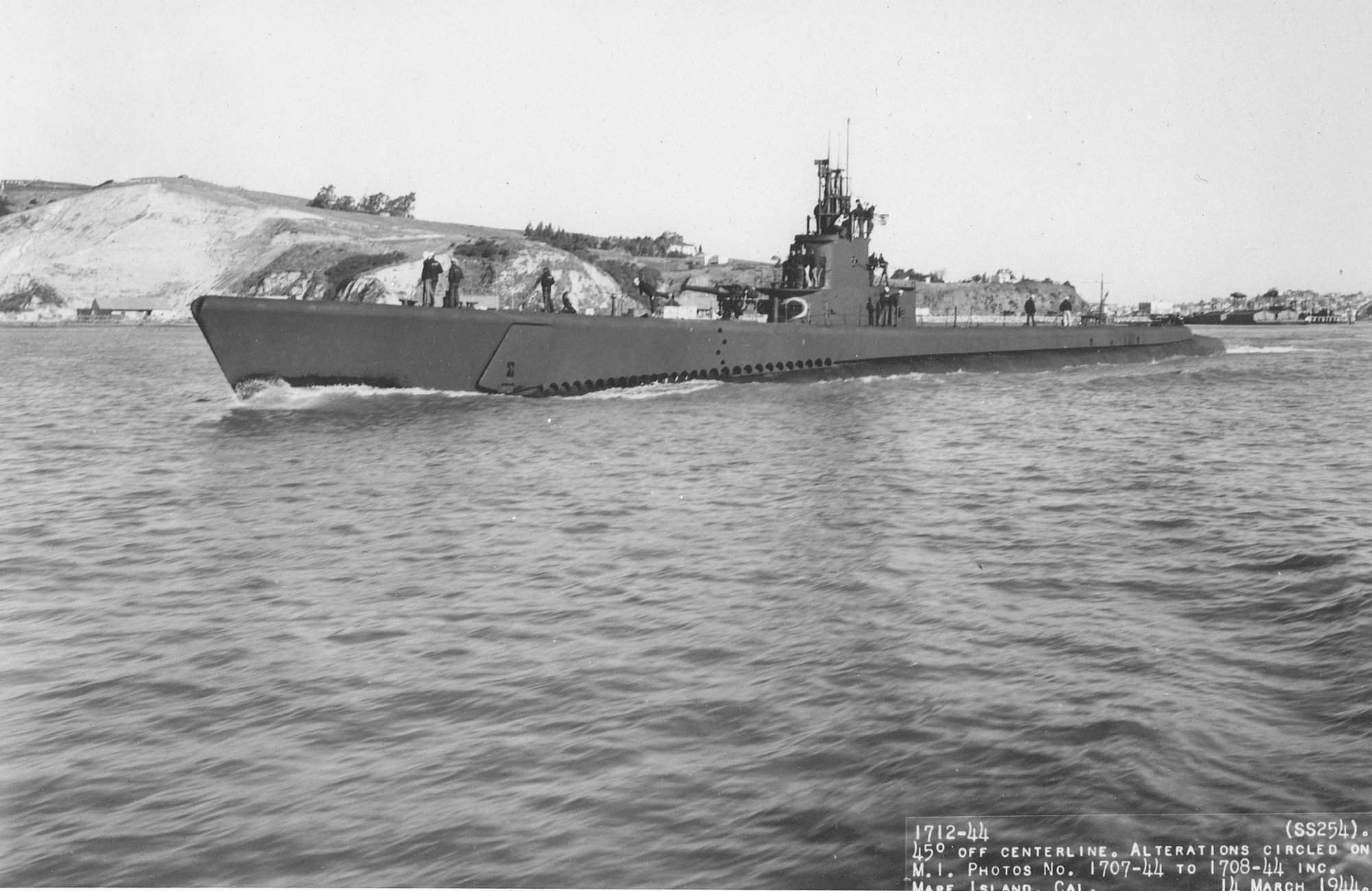
- USS Gurnard (SS-254) in 1944 after an overhaul at Mare Island Naval Shipyard, Vallejo, California

History

United States
- Builder: Electric Boat Company, Groton, Connecticut
- Laid down: 2 September 1941
- Launched: 1 June 1942
- Sponsored by: Miss Suzanne Slingluff
- Commissioned: 18 September 1942
- Decommissioned: 27 November 1945
- Stricken: 1 May 1961
- Honors and awards: Navy Unit Commendation; Six battle stars
- Fate: Sold for scrap, 29 October 1961

General characteristics
- Class & type: Gato-class diesel-electric submarine
- Displacement: 1,525 long tons (1,549 t) surfaced; 2,424 long tons (2,463 t) submerged
- Length: 311 ft 9 in (95.02 m)
- Beam: 27 ft 3 in (8.31 m)
- Draft: 17 ft 0 in (5.18 m) maximum
- Propulsion: 4 × Hooven-Owens-Rentschler (H.O.R.) diesel engines driving electrical generators; 2 × 126-cell Sargo batteries; 4 × high-speed General Electric electric motors with reduction gears; two propellers; 5,400 shp (4.0 MW) surfaced; 2,740 shp (2.0 MW) submerged
- Speed: 21 kn (39 km/h) surfaced; 9 kn (17 km/h) submerged
- Range: 11,000 nmi (20,000 km) surfaced at 10 kn (19 km/h)
- Endurance: 48 hours at 2 kn (4 km/h) submerged; 75 days on patrol
- Test depth: 300 ft (90 m)
- Complement: 6 officers, 54 enlisted
- Armament: 10 × 21-inch (533 mm) torpedo tubes; 6 forward, 4 aft; 24 torpedoes; 1 × 3-inch (76 mm) / 50 caliber deck gun; Bofors 40 mm and Oerlikon 20 mm cannon

USS Gurnard (SS-254), a Gato-class submarine, was the first ship of the United States Navy to be named for the gurnard.

== Construction and commissioning ==
Gurnard′s keel was laid down by the Electric Boat Company at Groton, Connecticut, on 2 September 1941. She was launched on 1 June 1942, sponsored by Miss Suzanne Slingluff, and commissioned on 18 September 1942.

== Atlantic Patrol ==
Following shakedown from New London, Connecticut, Gurnard sailed for Rosneath, Scotland, 2 November 1942 and reached that port 13 days later. Her first war patrol, 28 November to 27 December 1942, brought her to the Bay of Biscay where she lay off the Spanish coast awaiting German blockade runners bound for Spanish ports. The patrol was uneventful; no enemy ships were sighted and subsequently Gurnard returned to New London 9 February 1943 for repairs and alterations.

== Pacific Patrols ==
=== Second, third, and fourth war patrols, May 1943 – January 1944 ===
After reaching Pearl Harbor 26 May, the submarine got underway 12 June for her second war patrol. She patrolled off Toagel Mlungui Passage and on 29 June saw action for the first time, damaging two Japanese merchantmen and surviving 24 depth charges thrown by an enemy destroyer. Varied damage was inflicted on other ships in these waters before Gurnard made her first kill, sinking cargo ship Taiko Maru at 12°53′N 131°49′E. on 11 June 1943. Having expended all torpedoes, the submarine returned via Midway Island to Pearl Harbor, arriving 26 July for refit.

On 6 September, she set sail once again, this time heading towards the South China Sea for her third war patrol. In the early hours of 7 October, a five-ship convoy came into view, prompting Gurnard to initiate a pursuit. By 01:39 on 8 October, Gurnard had closed in on the convoy and successfully sunk the cargo ship Taian Maru and the passenger-cargo ship Dainichi Maru west of Luzon. This highly successful patrol concluded on 28 October when Gurnard arrived at Pearl Harbor.

One month later she sailed on her fourth patrol to prowl off the southeast coast of Honshū and soon found good hunting. A convoy was sighted 24 December and at 07:10 Gurnard attacked. Two minutes later cargo ship Seizan Maru No. 2 had broken in two and sunk; she was soon joined by cargo ship Tofuku Maru. Japanese destroyers attacked the submarine with over 80 depth charges without success. The crew celebrated by taking a couple of snaps of Mt. Fuji. They then had their Christmas dinner in Tokyo Bay. After damaging another merchantman on 27 December, Gurnard returned to Pearl Harbor 7 January 1944. From there she was sent Stateside for overhaul.

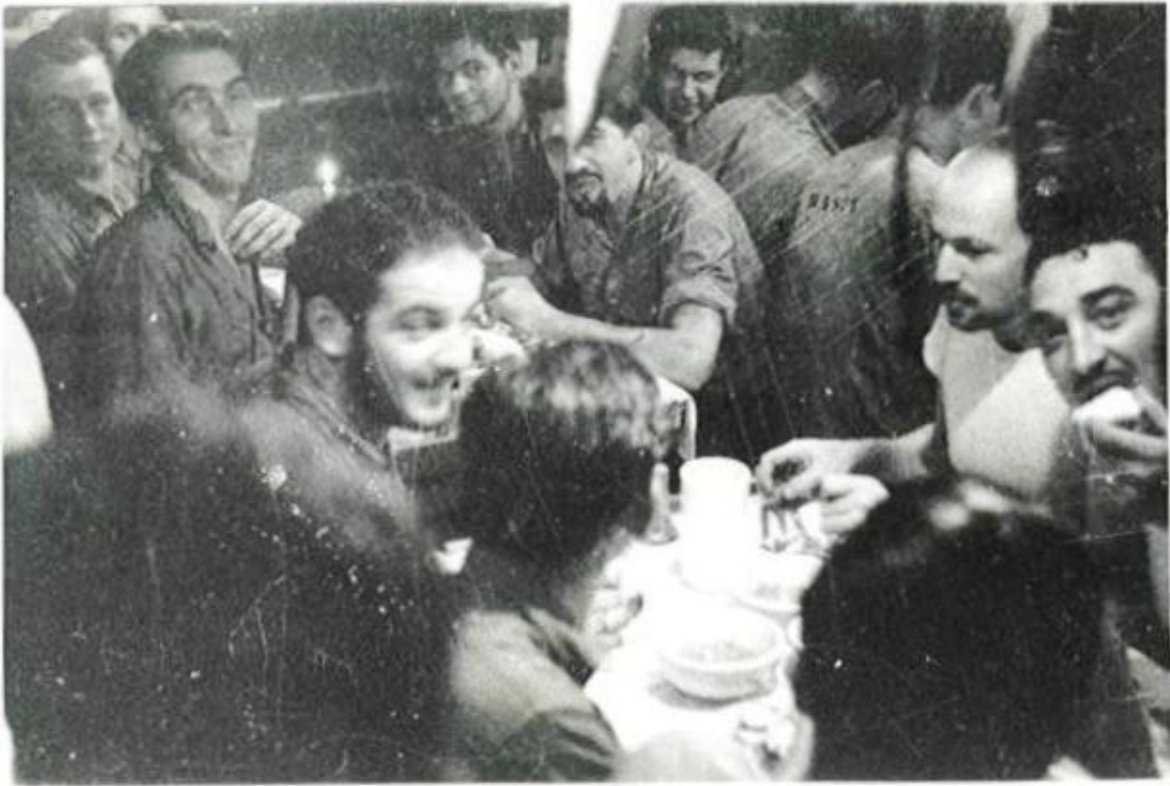
Crew of the Gurnard having Christmas dinner in 1943 while the Japanese patrol overhead

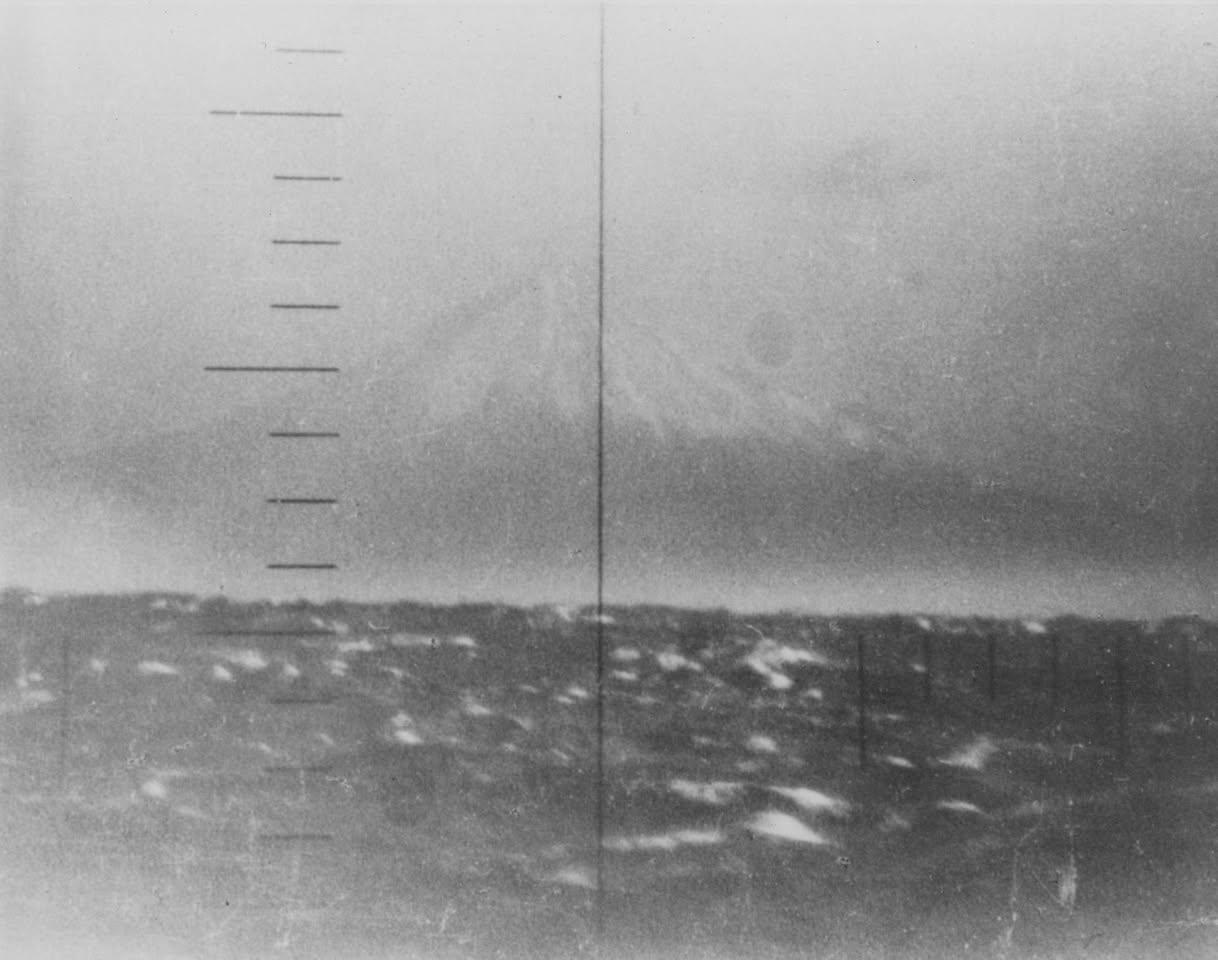
Japan's Mount Fuji photographed through the periscope of the USS Gurnard (SS-254).

=== Fifth, sixth, and seventh war patrols, April – November 1944 ===
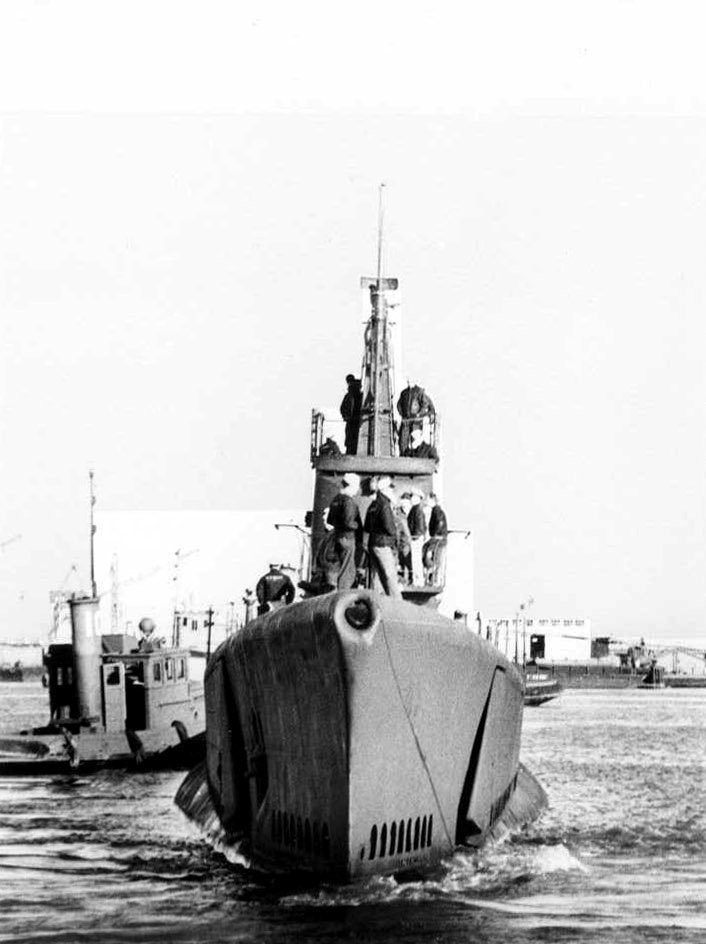
Gurnard on 14 March 1944 off Mare Island, California, following an overhaul.

Following overhaul at San Francisco Gurnard departed Pearl Harbor 16 April on her fifth war patrol, bound for the eastern Celebes Sea. On this patrol she chalked up one of the highest single-patrol tonnage scores of the Pacific war, attacking the Take Ichi convoy on 6 May and sinking 6,886-ton cargo ship Tenshinzan Maru, 6,995-ton passenger-cargo vessel Taijima Maru, and 5,824-ton passenger-cargo ship Aden Maru. Nearly a hundred depth charges rained down around her but she eluded the hunters and escaped undamaged. This vital convoy carried 40,000 troops intended to oppose Gen. MacArthur in New Guinea, and the embarked units suffered losses of nearly 50 percent. Gurnard's next kill occurred 24 May when several torpedoes sent to the bottom the 10,090-ton tanker Tatekawa Maru. No further opportunities presented themselves; and Gurnard put in at Fremantle, 11 June 1944 with the completion of the patrol.

The submarine stood out on her sixth patrol 8 July for the Banda, Molucca, Celebes, Sulu, and Mindanao Seas. After topping off at Darwin she patrolled off the Peleng Straits and damaged one merchantman before returning to Fremantle 5 September.

Gurnard's seventh patrol commenced 9 October after refit. While cruising off Borneo, she detected a five-ship enemy convoy. A successful attack was pressed home 3 November at the end of an 18-hour hunt, and two torpedoes demolished cargo ship Taimei Maru. Gurnard returned to her Australian port 17 November after this victory.

=== Eighth and ninth war patrols, December 1944 – May 1945 ===
The submarine's eighth and ninth patrols (11 December 1944 – 1 February 1945 and 10 March – 9 May 1945) included reconnaissance off Camranh Bay and patrols with submarines Hammerhead and Boarfish, but hunting was poor and no ships were sunk. Gurnard finished her final patrol at Pearl Harbor 9 May and put in at Mare Island, California, nine days later for a major overhaul. Following a round-trip voyage thence to Pearl Harbor and Midway, she returned to San Francisco 11 September 1945 and decommissioned there 27 November 1945.

Gurnard remained in reserve until 1 July 1949 when she reported to the San Francisco Naval Shipyard for activation as an armory for naval reserve submarine training. Towed to Pearl Harbor 27 November to 9 December 1949, the submarine served there until returning under tow to Tacoma, Wash., 18 May 1953 to continue reserve training duties in that port until June 1960. She was then inactivated in preparation for disposal. Her name was stricken from the Navy List 1 May 1961. She was sold for scrapping 26 September 1961 to the National Metal and Steel Corporation, Terminal Island, Los Angeles, California

== Awards ==
- Navy Unit Commendation
- Asiatic-Pacific Campaign Medal with six battle stars for service in World War II

Gurnard′s war patrols numbers two through seven were designated "successful."
