= Take Ichi convoy =

1944 Japanese military naval convoy

- Part of Pacific War
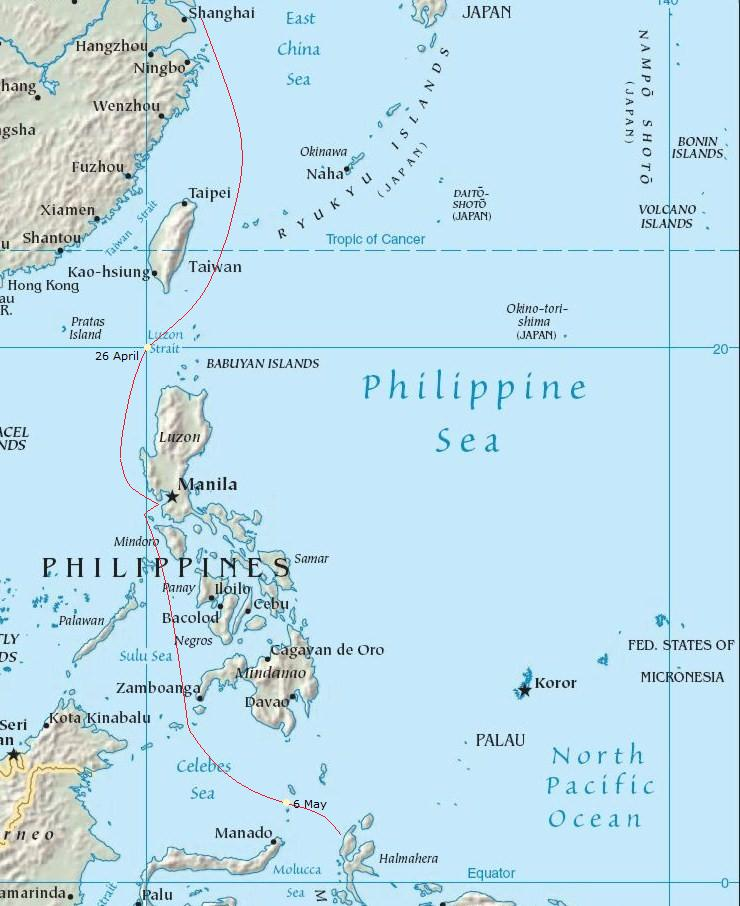
- The Take Ichi convoy's route from Shanghai to Halmahera (modern names shown)
Date	17 April – 9 May 1944
Location	Off Luzon and Celebes
Result	American victory

Belligerents
United States	Japan

Commanders and leaders
(United States) Ralph Waldo Christie (USN)	(Empire of Japan) Sadamichi Kajioka (IJN)

Strength
2 submarines	1 minelayer 3 destroyers 2 kaibokan escort ships 1 minesweeper 2 subchasers 3 gunboats 15 merchant ships

Casualties and losses
None	Four transports sunk 4,290 soldiers killed

The Take-Ichi sendan (Japanese: 竹一船団; lit. 'Bamboo Number One convoy') was a Japanese naval convoy of World War II. The convoy left occupied Shanghai on 17 April 1944, carrying two infantry divisions to reinforce Japan's defensive positions in the Philippines and western New Guinea. United States Navy (USN) submarines attacked the convoy on 26 April and 6 May, sinking four transports and killing more than 4,000 soldiers. These losses caused the convoy to be diverted to Halmahera, where the surviving soldiers and their equipment were unloaded.

The Take Ichi convoy's losses had important strategic results. The failure to bring the two divisions to their destination without loss contributed to the Japanese Imperial General Headquarters' decision to move Japan's defensive perimeter back by 1,000 km (600 mi). The divisions' combat power was also blunted by their losses, and while they both saw action against United States Army forces, they contributed little to Japan's war effort.

== Background ==
In September 1943, the Imperial Japanese Navy (IJN) and Imperial Japanese Army (IJA) agreed to establish defensive positions along what was termed Japan's "absolute zone of national defense". The zone's perimeter reached from the Marianas Islands and Caroline Islands to western New Guinea and the Banda and Flores Seas. At this time there were few Army units in the area, and it was decided to move combat units from China and Manchuria to protect the airfields that were the basis of Japan's defensive plans. The movement of these troops was delayed by shipping shortages, however. Efforts to reinforce the Marianas and Caroline islands were assigned the highest priority. The units selected for western New Guinea remained in China until April 1944 before ships became available to transport them.

By early 1944, Allied submarines were sinking large numbers of Japanese ships. Their activities were frequently guided by "Magic" intelligence relating to ship movements which was collected by intercepting and decrypting encoded radio transmissions. The IJN routinely broadcast the location and intended route of convoys under its protection and decrypting these messages allowed Allied naval commanders to alert submarines in the vicinity of convoys. The submarine commanders were free to plan their interception and attack where conditions were most favorable.

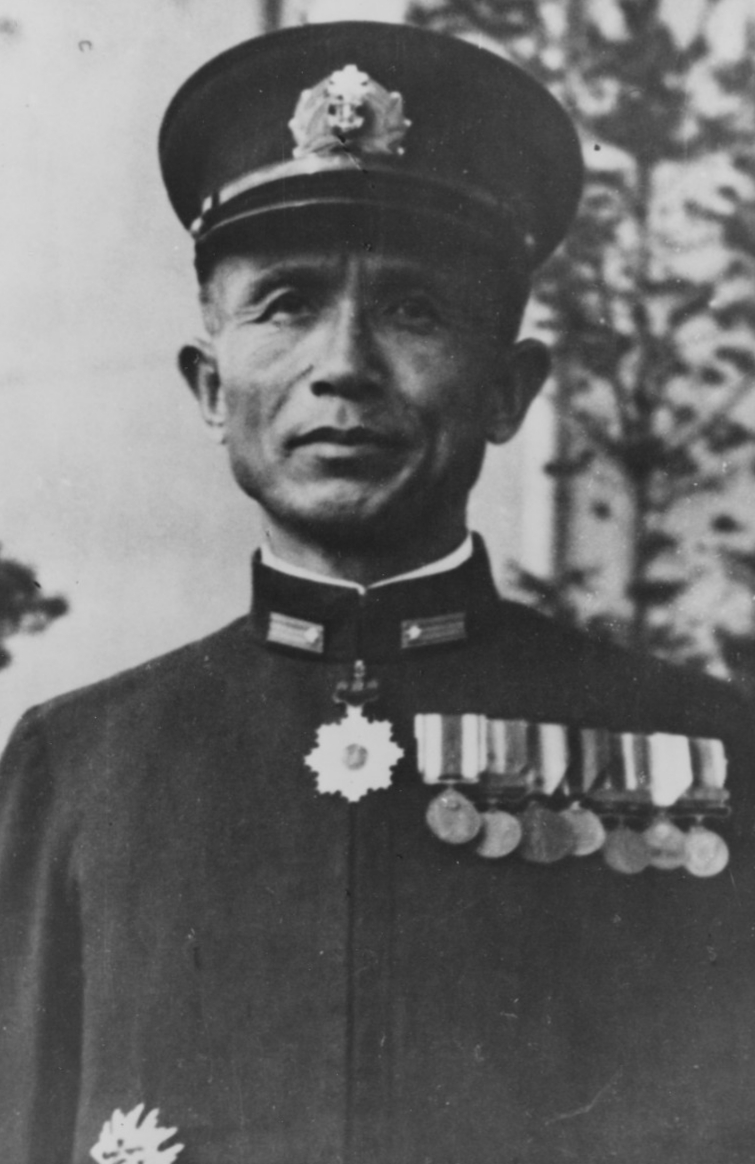
Rear Admiral Sadamichi Kajioka in 1944

The IJN's faulty anti-submarine doctrine also contributed to Japan's shipping losses. The Navy had placed a low priority on protecting merchant shipping from submarine attack before and during the early years of the war and convoys were not routinely assembled until 1943. The Grand Escort Headquarters was formed in late 1943 to coordinate convoys and implement a standard doctrine. The escort-of-convoy headquarters was also established in April 1944 to provide a pool of senior commanders who were available to command convoys, though none had any experience with convoy operations or anti-submarine warfare.

Attacks on merchant shipping during February 1944 led the Japanese to change the composition of their convoys. During this month, over ten percent of the Japanese merchant marine was sunk by Allied submarines and air attack. These losses included several transport ships carrying reinforcements for the Marianas and Carolines. In response, the Grand Escort Fleet Headquarters increased the average size of Japanese convoys from five ships to "large" convoys of ten to twenty vessels. This change allowed the IJN to allocate more escort ships to each convoy and it was hoped that conducting fewer convoys would also reduce the number of targets available to submarines. While Japanese officers attributed a drop in sinkings during March to the changed tactics, this was actually due to the U.S. Pacific Fleet's submarines being diverted to support raids conducted by the Fast Carrier Task Force that month.

The Take Ichi convoy was assembled at Shanghai in April 1944. Its task was to carry the 32nd Division to Mindanao and the main body of the 35th Division to western New Guinea. Both divisions had been formed in 1939 and were veterans of fighting in China during the Second Sino-Japanese War. One of the 35th Division's three infantry regiments was detached from the division in early April and sent to the Palau islands, arriving there later that month without loss.

The two divisions embarked on large transport ships protected by an unusually strong escort force. Rear Admiral Sadamichi Kajioka—who was a veteran of several previous operations, including the Battle of Wake Island—was appointed to command the convoy. The escort force was the newly-established 6th Escort Convoy Command and included Kajioka's flagship, the coal burning minelayer Shirataka, as well as destroyers Asakaze, Shiratsuyu and Fujinami, ocean escort ships (kaibokan) Kurahashi, CD-20 and CD-22, minesweeper W-2, subchasers CH-37 and CH-38 and gunboats Uji, Ataka and Tama Maru No. 7.

== Voyage ==
=== Shanghai to Manila ===
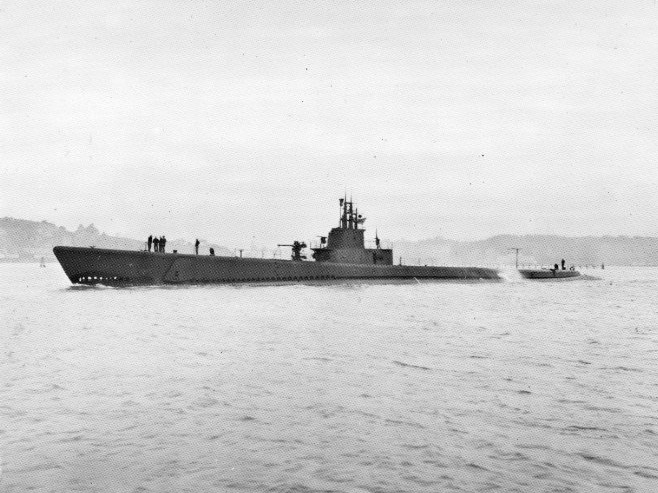
USS Jack in December 1943

The Take Ichi convoy sailed from Shanghai bound for Manila on 17 April, and initially comprised 15 transports and the 6th Escort Convoy Command. Seven of the transports were traveling to Manila only and the 32nd and 35th Divisions were each carried by four vessels. Allied code breakers decrypted radio signals relating to the convoy's departure and subsequent intercepts allowed radio traffic analysts to follow its progress south.

Intelligence from the intercepted radio signals was used to guide the submarine USS Jack toward the convoy, and she made contact with it off the northwest coast of Luzon on the morning of 26 April. The submarine's captain—Commander (later rear admiral) Tommy Dykers—attempted to maneuver into a position to attack the convoy but lost contact when he was forced to evade a Japanese submarine. An aircraft sighted and attacked Jack a few minutes later, but the convoy did not change course. Dykers regained contact at midday after sighting Shirataka's heavy smoke exhaust and surfaced an hour before sunset to get into an attack position. He was forced to submerge, however, when another aircraft attacked the submarine.

Jack surfaced again after dark, and successfully attacked after the moon set. Dykers found that the Japanese escorts were alert, and was unable to penetrate the convoy. As a result, he attacked three times by firing a total of 19 torpedoes from long range into the mass of ships at the center of the convoy. These attacks sank the 5,425-ton freighter SS Yoshida Maru No. 1, which was carrying an entire regiment of the 32nd Division. All 3,000 soldiers onboard drowned when the ship sank quickly. The remaining Japanese ships continued to Manila, arriving there on 29 April.

=== Manila to Halmahera ===
The 32nd Division's destination changed during the voyage from Shanghai to Manila. Imperial General Headquarters was concerned that the increasing difficulty of shipping units towards the front line meant that it would not be possible to complete the planned reinforcement of the "absolute zone of national defense" before Allied forces reached the area. As a result, it was decided to use the division to reinforce the Second Army in western New Guinea and the eastern Netherlands East Indies (NEI)—which were under direct threat of attack—rather than send it to Mindanao.

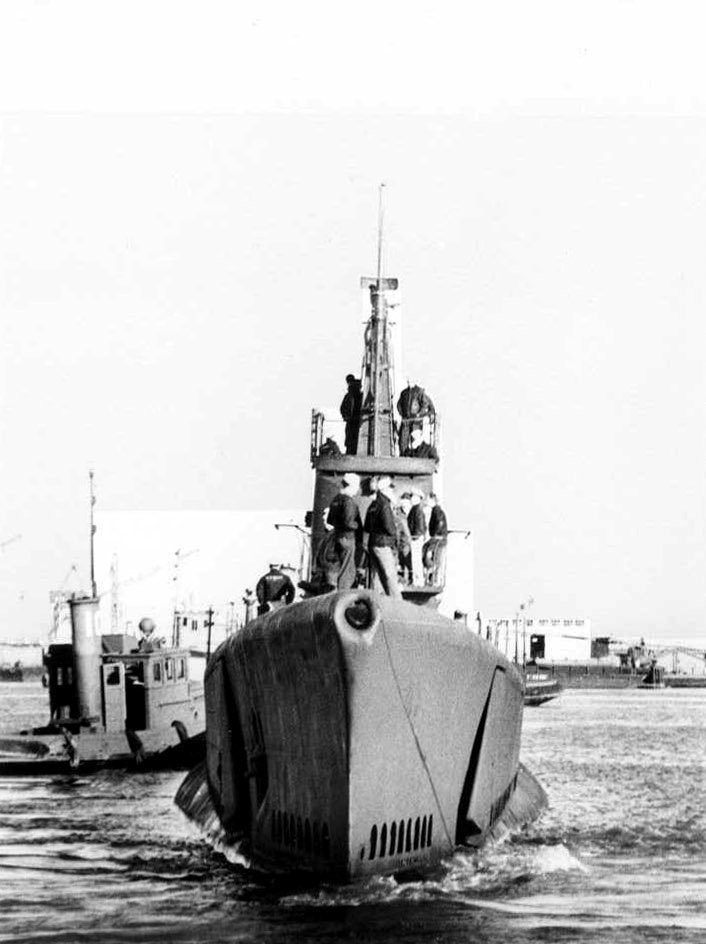
USS Gurnard in March 1944

The Take Ichi convoy resumed its journey to New Guinea on 1 May. Its composition was now eight transports (one of the Manila-bound transports having replaced Yoshida Maru) under the protection of Shirataka, Asakaze, Shiratsuyu, minesweeper W-22, CH-37 and CH-38. The convoy took a special route planned by the Third Southern Expeditionary Fleet to reduce the risk of submarine attack.

U.S. signals intelligence operators again detected the convoy's departure. On 2 May, analysts estimated its size as nine transports and seven escorts carrying 12,784 troops of the 32nd Division and an unknown number of men from the 35th Division. Decoded Japanese Army Water Transport Code messages also provided the Allies with the convoy's route, speed, daily noon positions and destination. This "extraordinary intelligence coup" was passed to the relevant commands on 2 May and the USN positioned submarines to ambush the Japanese ships.

The Take Ichi convoy suffered a devastating submarine attack on 6 May. On that day, USS Gurnard intercepted the Japanese ships in the Celebes Sea near the northeastern tip of Celebes. Gurnard's captain—Commander Herb Andrews—submerged his boat and made a cautious approach to avoid detection by aircraft. He reached a firing position four hours later and fired six torpedoes at two transports. Only one of these torpedoes struck its mark, and a second salvo missed its intended targets but hit another transport. Andrews then turned his boat and fired further torpedoes from Gurnard's stern torpedo tubes which hit a third transport. One of the Japanese destroyers counterattacked Gurnard and forced Andrews to break off his attack. The destroyer was traveling at too great a speed for her detection gear to function, however, and did not damage the submarine, despite dropping approximately 100 depth charges.

Gurnard rose to periscope depth two hours later and found that a major effort to rescue troops and equipment from the torpedoed transports was under way. That night, the submarine torpedoed one of the crippled transports which was still afloat. Gurnard's attack sank transports Aden Maru (5,825 tons) and Taijima Maru (6,995 tons) as well as the cargo ship Tenshinzan Marau (6,886 tons). While the rescue effort was relatively successful, 1,290 troops were killed and much of their equipment was lost.

Due to its heavy losses, the Take Ichi convoy was ordered to dock at Halmahera in the eastern NEI rather than continue to New Guinea. The surviving ships arrived there on 9 May. Both divisions and their equipment were unloaded and the convoy sailed for Manila on 13 May, arriving on 20 May without further loss.

== Aftermath ==
The attacks on the Take Ichi convoy blunted the 32nd and 35th Divisions' fighting power. The 32nd Division's combat elements were reduced from nine to five infantry battalions and from four to one and a half artillery battalions. Only four of the six 35th Division infantry battalions which sailed in the convoy reached Halmahera and much of the division's artillery was lost.

The loss of the Take Ichi convoy greatly assisted U.S. Army general Douglas MacArthur's double invasions of Hollandia and Aitape on 22 April 1944, hundreds of kilometers to the west of the previous battle line in eastern New Guinea. MacArthur's forces were able to advance rapidly westwards with minimal casualties within the next five months all the way to Morotai, just a short distance from Halmahera, partly as a result of the failure by these Japanese troops to be able to reach most of western New Guinea.

The destruction of the Take Ichi convoy also forced the Japanese leadership to acknowledge that it was no longer possible to reinforce or defend most of western New Guinea. While the Second Area Army's commander, Lieutenant General Korechika Anami, requested that the surviving ships attempt to carry the 35th Division to New Guinea, this was rejected by Imperial General Headquarters. The losses inflicted on the convoy also contributed to the Imperial General Headquarters' decision to move the perimeter of the "absolute zone of national defense" back to a line extending from Sorong to Halmahera. This represented a 1,000 km (600 mi) strategic withdrawal from the perimeter which had been planned in March.

Japanese naval staff officers gathered in Manila in June to analyze the Take Ichi convoy. The officers believed that Japan's communication codes were secure and discussed alternative explanations for the convoy's detection. These explanations included the increase in radio signals at the time the convoy sailed being detected by Allied radio traffic analysts, a Japanese officer in Manila accidentally divulging information and Allied spies working on the Manila waterfront radioing messages about the convoy's composition and departure. The meeting concluded that Allied spies were responsible for the convoy's detection, and the Japanese military's codes were not changed.

Some of the surviving elements of the 32nd and 35th Divisions later saw action against American forces. The 35th Division was moved forward from Halmahera to Sorong in small ships during May. The regiment which had been sent to the Palaus in April was also successfully transferred to New Guinea. Elements of the 35th Division subsequently fought in the battles of Biak and Sansapor, but most of the division was stationed on the Vogelkop Peninsula, where it was isolated from September 1944. The 32nd Division was retained at Halmahera to garrison the island. Much of the division later saw action on the neighboring island of Morotai, where it suffered heavy losses while trying to counterattack an Allied force which had established a base there during September and October 1944.
