= 356th Infantry Division =

- 356. Infanterie-Division
- Divisional insignia
- Active: May 1943 – May 1945
- Country: Nazi Germany
- Branch: Army
- Type: Infantry
- Size: Division
- Engagements: World War II: Battle of Anzio; Gustav Line; Gothic Line; Operation Spring Awakening

Commanders
- Notable commanders: Egon von Neindorff

The 356th Infantry Division was a unit of the German Army (Heer) created in Toulon France in May 1943, which fought in Italy, Hungary and Austria.

== Details ==
The 356th Infantry Division was formed on May 1, 1943, as the "Gisela" unit near Toulon in southern France.

In November 1943, the division was transferred from France to Italy, to the Ligurian coast between Ventimiglia and Genoa. In the spring of 1944, units of the division were deployed to fight partisans in northern Italy between Liguria and Piedmont. The 356th Fusilier Battalion was relocated to the Anzio-Nettuno area at the end of January 1944 and took part in the Battle of Anzio near Cisterna di Latina and Velletri. From mid-February to early March it was then deployed to the Monti Aurunci near Castelforte and the Monti Ausoni near Coreno Ausonio on the Gustav Line. The 1st Battalion of the 871st Grenadier Regiment was also relocated to the Gustav Line on the Garigliano River at the beginning of March and fought there in costly defensive battles until the end of March. In June 1944 the division was relocated to Tuscany and then deployed to the Gothic Line in Tuscany and Emilia-Romagna.

In July 1944, the division was involved in fierce defensive battles south of Florence near Greve in Chianti against attacking South African units with which the Allies began their attack on Florence. Between January and August, members of the division were involved in numerous war crimes against the Italian civilian population. In total, over 200 people were victims of war crimes committed by the division. By September 1944, the entire division had reached the "Grün-Stellung" (Gothic Line). This was followed by a march along the Via Emilia into the area between San Marino and Rimini. After heavy defensive battles on both sides of the Via Emilia, the division withdrew by December 1944 via the Savio, Bidente and Montane rivers to the Senio River near Bagnacavallo.

In January 1945, the division was relocated through northern Italy, first to Hungary. In March 1945, it fought at Lake Balaton and near Székesfehérvár in Operation Spring Awakening and then withdrew to Austria via Komárom and Győr. In May 1945, the division was taken prisoner of war by the US Army near Wiener Neustadt.

== Commanders ==
- General Lieutenant Egon von Neindorff (1 May 1943 – 15 May 1943)
- General Lieutenant Karl Faulenbach (15 May 1943 – Oct 1944)
- Oberst Kleinhenz ( Oct 1944 – Feb 1945)
- Oberst von Saldern ( Feb 1945 – 8 May 1945)

== Manpower strength ==
=== April 7th 1945 ===
- 56 Officers
- 264 Non-commissioned officers
- 894 Soldiers
- 3 Hetzers

== Order of battle ==
- Grenadier-Regiment 869
- Grenadier-Regiment 870
- Grenadier-Regiment 871
- Artillerie-Regiment 356
- Pionier-Bataillon 356
- Feldersatz-Bataillon 356
- Schnelle Abteilung 356
- Aufklärungs-Abteilung 356
- Divisions-Nachrichten-Abteilung 356
- Divisions-Nachschubführer 356
