= Anzio order of battle =

Anzio order of battle is a listing of the significant formations that were involved in the fighting for the Anzio bridgehead south of Rome, January 1944 – June 1944

== Allied forces and organization ==
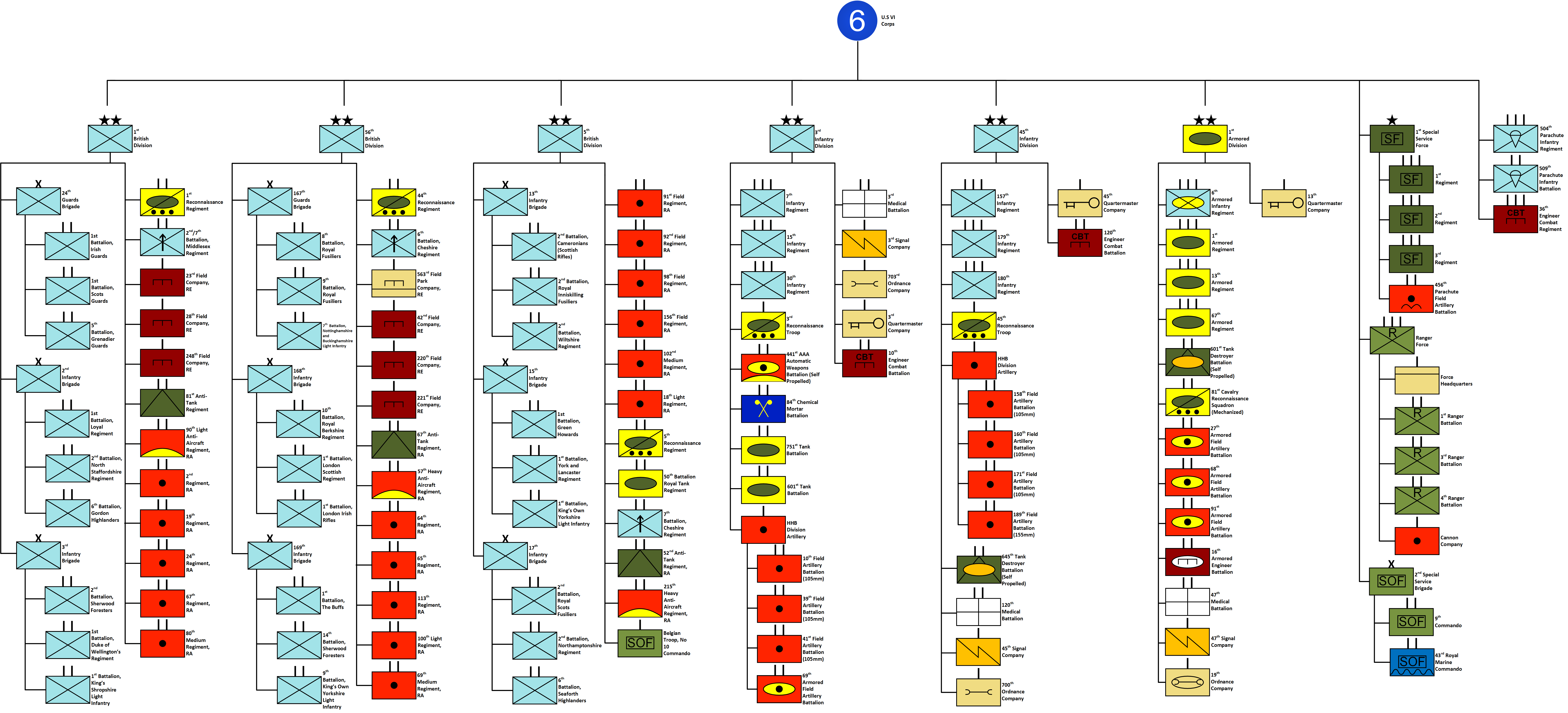
US VI Corps as organized during the Battle of Anzio 22 January to 31 March 1944

Commander-in-Chief of Allied Armies in Italy was General Sir Harold Alexander

US Fifth Army, commanded by Lieutenant-General Mark Wayne Clark, committed two corps reinforced with divisions of British X Corps

US VI Corps
Commanded by Major-General John P. Lucas until February 23, then Major-General Lucian K. Truscott. Truscottt was deputy commander from 16 February to February 23. Major-General Vyvyan Evelegh became deputy commander from 16 February to 18 March

- 3rd Infantry Division (Major-General Lucian K. Truscott until February 23 then Brigadier General John W. O'Daniel) until 25 May 1944
- British 1st Infantry Division (Major-General Ronald Penney)
- 45th Infantry Division (Major-General William W. Eagles)
- 1st Armored Division (Major-General Ernest N. Harmon)
- 34th Infantry Division (Major-General Charles W. Ryder) (from March 1944)
- 36th Infantry Division (Major-General Fred L. Walker) (from April 1944)

British X Corps

- British 5th Infantry Division (Major-General Philip Gregson-Ellis) (from March 1944)
- British 56th Infantry Division (Major-General Gerald Templer) (from mid- February 1944 until mid-March 1944)
- US-Canadian First Special Service Force (from early February, replacing the Ranger battalions) (Note: Designated three regiments on paper, the Force actually totalled about 2,000 men at full strength.)
- 6615th Ranger Force
  - 1st Ranger Battalion
  - 3rd Ranger Battalion
  - 4th Ranger Battalion
  - 83rd Chemical Battalion
  - U.S. 509th Parachute Infantry Battalion)
- 504th Parachute Infantry Regiment
- British 2nd Special Service Brigade
  - No 9 Army Commando
  - No. 40 (Royal Marine) Commando

U.S. II Corps (from 25 May 1944)

Major-General Geoffrey Keyes
- 88th Infantry Division (Major-General John E. Sloan)
- 85th Infantry Division (Major-General John B. Coulter)
- 3rd Infantry Division (Brigadier General John W. O'Daniel)

== Axis forces and organization ==
Army Group C commanded by Generalfeldmarschall Albert Kesselring

German Fourteenth Army

General Eberhard von Mackensen (until end May 1944, then under direct command of Kesselring)

I Parachute Corps (General Alfred Schlemm)

- 4th Parachute Division (Major-General Heinrich Trettner)
  - Autonomous Paratroopers Battalion "Nembo" (Captain Corradino Alvino) (Note: Autonomous unit of the RSI, but operationally depended on the 4th Parachute Division.)
- 29th Panzergrenadier Division (Lieutenant-General Walter Fries)
- 65th Infantry Division (Major-General Hellmuth Pfeifer)
- 715th Infantry Division (Major-General Hans-Georg Hildebrandt)
  - Barbarigo Battalion (Captain Umberto Bardelli) (Note: Attached to the 10th Marine Infantry Division from May 1944.)
- 114th Jäger Division (Lieutenant-General Karl Eglseer)

German LXXVI Panzer Corps (General Traugott Herr)

- 3rd Panzergrenadier Division (Lieutenant-General Fritz-Hubert Gräser)
- 26th Panzer Division (Lieutenant-General Smilo Freiherr von Lüttwitz)
- Hermann Göring Panzer Division (Major-General Paul Conrath)
- 362nd Infantry Division (Major-General Heinz Greiner)
- 71st Infantry Division (Lieutenant-General Wilhelm Raapke)

Decima Flottiglia MAS (Captain Junio Valerio Borghese)

- 10th Marine Infantry Division (General Giuseppe Corrado) (Note: Formed from May 1944)

== Sources ==
- Clark, Lloyd (2006). Anzio: The Friction of War. Italy and the Battle for Rome 1944. London: Headline Publishing Group. ISBN 978-0-7553-1420-1.
- "Orders of Battle.com". Archived from the original on 17 July 2007.
- Houterman, Hans; Koppes, Jeroen. "World War II unit histories and officers". Archived from the original on 26 June 2007.
- Wendell, Marcus. "Axis History Factbook: German army order of battle". Archived from the original on 2006-10-29.
