= 6615th Ranger Force =

Military unit

The 6615th Ranger Force was a regiment of the United States Army, raised for service in World War II. It served in the Italian Campaign and lost two whole battalions at the Battle of Cisterna, part of the Battle of Anzio in early 1944.

== Formation ==
The 6615th Ranger Force was formed specially for use in the Anzio landings (codenamed Operation Shingle). The 1st, 3rd, and 4th Ranger Battalions, the 509th Parachute Infantry Battalion, and several other units were molded into a temporary regiment given the name "6615th Ranger Force." Colonel William Orlando Darby, the former commanding officer (CO) of the famous 1st Ranger Battalion, became the regimental commanding officer. Lieutenant Colonel Hermann Dammer served as the regimental executive officer (XO).

== Units and commanding officers ==
6615th Ranger Force-Colonel William O. Darby, C.O.

- 1st Ranger Battalion-Major Jack Dobson, C.O.
- 3rd Ranger Battalion-Major Alvah Miller, C.O.
- 4th Ranger Battalion-Lieutenant Colonel Roy Murray, C.O.
- 509th Parachute Infantry Battalion, Lieutenant Colonel William P. Yarborough, C.O.
- 83rd Chemical Mortar Battalion
- 36th Engineer Brigade

== Combat missions ==
The 6615th landed at Peter Beach in the port of Anzio, on January 22, 1944. It suffered very few casualties and moved into the city itself. After the U.S. VI Corps occupied Anzio, the corps commander, Major General John P. Lucas and the 3rd Division commander, Major General Lucian Truscott, met with Colonel Darby and decided to have the Rangers sneak behind the German lines and capture the town of Cisterna. The corps and division intelligence officers thought that there was a gap in the German lines. However, the German commanders, Field Marshal Albert von Kesselring and General Eberhard von Mackensen suspected an American attack in the vicinity of Cisterna and sent a large force of crack troops, armored units, and artillery to cut off the Rangers.

On the night of January 30, 1944, the 1st and 3rd Ranger battalions made their way behind enemy lines and killed the German sentries in Cisterna. Suddenly, concealed German artillery and armor opened fire on the Americans. One of the first shells killed Major Miller, the 3rd Battalion commander. Major Dobson, the 1st Battalion C.O., took command of the two battalions. The Rangers took cover and started firing, but rifles were no match for the heavy German equipment. All of the Rangers fought bravely, killing a good number of Germans, but they suffered many more killed and wounded. Major Dobson was among the wounded.

When Colonel Darby, Colonel Dammer, and the other staff officers in the 6615th Regimental Headquarters found out about the plight of the 1st and 3rd battalions, Lt. Colonel Murray's 4th Battalion, with armored and infantry support, fought a bitter, bloody battle with the Germans to try to save the surrounded Rangers of the 1st and 3rd. Many Germans were killed in the two-day battle that followed. However, the relief force was stalled too long to be of much help to their fellow Rangers. Out of the 767 Rangers who made it into Cisterna, only 6 made it out. The rest were either killed or captured.

== After Cisterna ==
Cisterna marked the end of the 6615th as a complete regiment. The 4th Battalion was attached to the 504th Parachute Infantry Regiment and then to the 1st Special Service Force. Colonels Darby and Dammer were given different assignments. Darby eventually became assistant division commander of the 10th Mountain Division and was killed by an artillery shell while he was riding in a jeep in northern Italy.

After the Battle of Cisterna, the 509th Parachute Infantry Battalion bore the brunt of a German counterattack. One of its companies was overrun, but the other companies fought valiantly and, with reinforcements from other regiments and divisions, was able to repulse the attack and took part in a parachute landing in Southern France. It ended the war with a very distinguished record.

== On film ==
The Battle of Cisterna and the story of the six Rangers who made it out is depicted in the 1968 film Anzio.

- Darby's Rangers, 1942-45-by Mir Bahmanyer
- Rangers in World War II-by Robert Black
- Anzio 1944-by Steven J. Zaloga
- The Ranger Force: Darby's Rangers in World War II
