= Darby's Rangers =

1958 film

- Original film poster
- Directed by: William Wellman
- Written by: Guy Trosper
- Based on: Darby's Rangers: An Illustrated Portrayal of the Original Rangers by James J. Altieri
- Produced by: Martin Rackin
- Starring: James Garner; Jack Warden; Stuart Whitman
- Narrated by: Jack Warden
- Cinematography: William H. Clothier
- Edited by: Owen Marks
- Music by: Max Steiner
- Distributed by: Warner Bros. Pictures
- Release date: February 12, 1958
- Running time: 121 minutes
- Country: United States
- Language: English

Darby's Rangers (released in the UK as The Young Invaders) is a 1958 American war film starring James Garner as William Orlando Darby, who organizes and leads the first units of United States Army Rangers during World War II. Directed by William Wellman, the film was shot by Warner Bros. Pictures in black and white, to match wartime stock footage included in the production. It was inspired by the 1945 book Darby's Rangers: An Illustrated Portrayal of the Original Rangers, by Major James J. Altieri, himself a veteran of Darby's force.

The leading role was Garner's first. Jack Warden and Stuart Whitman appear in support.

== Plot ==
In the spring of 1942 the US Army decides to form an elite strike force similar to the heralded British Commandos. Led by Major William Darby, a former staff officer, the 1st Ranger Battalion is formed on June 19, 1942. He and Master Sergeant Saul Rosen, who narrates the film, recruit a variety of men who train under veteran Commando units in Dundee, Scotland. Darby tells his men that the Commandos are the best soldiers in the world, but in time the Rangers will own that distinction.

The American trainees are quartered in Scottish homes and several of the Rangers pair off with local lassies: Rollo Burns with Peggy McTavish, the daughter of the fearsome but humorous Scottish Commando instructor, Sergeant McTavish; and vagabond Hank Bishop, with prim and proper, Wendy Hollister.

The Rangers prove their worth in Operation Torch during the invasion of French North Africa, and two more battalions are formed. Darby is promoted to colonel.

He is a strong leader, who accepts certain informalities in his units as the means of getting the most out of his men and their special tactics. Joining the Rangers is Second Lieutenant Arnold Dittmann, a by-the-book stickler straight out of West Point.

The Rangers fight successfully in heavy, often close-quarter combat in the Allied invasion of Sicily. Lt. Dittmann is humanized not by the fighting or his grizzled veterans, but by an encounter with the beautiful and strong willed Angelina De Lotta.

Darby confides to Rosen a recurring dream of being run over by an oncoming train; he seems certain he will be killed in combat. During the Battle of Anzio, the 1st and 3rd Ranger Battalions are sent on a dangerous mission, and are ambushed by the Germans in the Battle of Cisterna. Darby leads his 4th Ranger Battalion in an unsuccessful rescue attempt. Few men make it back, with the majority being captured. Burns, who had promised MacTavish he would marry his daughter if he came back alive, is among the dead.

After the heavy losses at Cisterna, the Ranger units are disbanded. Brief vignettes show Bishop on leave with Wendy and her family, and Dittman reunited with Angelina.

Darby is ordered to report to Army HQ at the Pentagon. At the Anzio beachhead, Rosen bids him goodbye. As Darby walks alone down the beach to board a landing craft he perfunctorily waves his arm at salutes from newly arrived troops. When a soldier excitedly calls out, “Look at that Ranger patch!” Darby straightens up and snaps off his salutes with pride, and continues to do so until the boarding ramp is lifted.

A postscript adds that the Rangers’ “rugged hard-hitting methods of training inspired techniques now employed by all fighting units of the United States Army.”

Darby later returned to Italy, and was killed in action with the 10th Mountain Division just days before the end of the war in 1945. He was posthumously promoted to the rank of brigadier general.

== Cast ==
- James Garner as William Orlando Darby
- Etchika Choureau as Angelina De Lotta
- Jack Warden as M/Sgt. Saul Rosen
- Edward Byrnes as Lt. Arnold Dittman
- Venetia Stevenson as Peggy McTavish
- Torin Thatcher as Sgt. McTavish
- Peter Brown as Rollo Burns
- Joan Elan as Wendy Hollister
- Corey Allen as Tony Sutherland
- Stuart Whitman as Hank Bishop
- Murray Hamilton as Sims Delancey
- Bill Wellman Jr. as Eli Clatworthy
- Andrea King as Sheilah Andrews
- Adam Williams as Heavy Hall
- Frieda Inescort as Lady Hollister
- Reginald Owen as Sir Arthur Hollister
- Philip Tonge as John Andrews
- Edward Ashley as Lt. Dave Manson
- Raymond Bailey as Brig. Gen. W.A. Wise
- Willis Bouchey as Gen. Lucian Truscott
- Sean Garrison as Young Soldier (film debut, uncredited)
- Norm Grabowski as a Squad member

== Production ==
Warner Bros. Pictures had produced a financial and critical hit in 1955's Battle Cry, and was anxious to repeat the success with a film based on Major James Altieri's novel "Darby's Rangers". Altieri was known to Warner Brothers, as he had been technical advisor on Force of Arms (1951). Director William Wellman had established a reputation for turning out top war films with The Story of G.I. Joe and Battleground. He agreed to the film on the condition that Warner Brothers finance his dream project, Lafayette Escadrille, about his experience as a pilot in the famed World War I French Foreign Legion air squadron. Warner Brothers insisted on emphasizing the romantic pairings of most of the leads to emulate its success doing so in Battle Cry.

A problem arose with the United States Army. The United States Marine Corps had enthusiastically lent bases, Marine extras, and film of its campaigns to Hollywood films to boost its public image. While the Army had as well, it was not so keen on this project, reflecting its feeling that Ranger operations had led to heavy losses of excellent soldiers it thought would have been better employed leading regular infantry units. By the 1950s, rather than the separate Ranger units shown in the movie, the Army preferred training individual officers and NCOs at the Ranger School, who then returned to their units and trained them in Ranger tactics and military values. Thus, the U.S. Army's co-operation was limited to training the actors and providing black-and-white stock footage.

Tab Hunter says Wellman offered him the lead role, the director hoping to reunite the stars of Lafayette Escadrille (Etchika Choureau would co star and the director's son William Wellman Jr. also appeared in both films) but Hunter was tired of war films and turned him down. He was replaced by Edd Byrnes.

Originally, Charlton Heston was cast as William O. Darby. He was enthusiastic about portraying a recent historical figure; he could interview people who knew Darby in creating his characterization. However, he asked for five percent of the profits. Jack L. Warner thought he was joking, until just before filming. (Heston later sued Warner Bros for $250,000 – $100,000 fee, $50,000 further earnings, and $100,000 damage to his career.)

Warner looked to his studio's contracted actors and chose thirty-year-old Korean War veteran James Garner, already slated to appear in a featured part. He had the proper appearance and age to play Darby, who was killed in battle at age thirty-four. It was his first leading film role. His place in the film was taken by Stuart Whitman. (Garner too would later sue Warner Brothers).

Garner later wrote in his memoirs that he did not feel Wellman "wanted me in the part... and I don't blame him: I was too young for it and he deserved a bigger star. But we got along fine because we respected each other."

By extensively using original World War II film footage and black and white cinematography, Darby's Rangers was able to be filmed economically on the studio backlot.

== Promotion ==
The premiere showing in several major US cities was preceded by a banquet where James Garner sat side by side at the head table with the highest-ranking Darby Ranger in that city still in the service.

== Reception ==
In his February 13, 1958 review in The New York Times, Bosley Crowther wryly observed that viewers “ might gather… that the major interest and pursuit of the special combat force of American soldiers that bore that tag in World War II was chasing after women. Virtually every conspicuous Ranger in this film, with the exception of the stalwart commander, runs down and catches himself a dame… the conduct of military affairs, including training and combat encounters, is given secondary emphasis in this film. The founding and the fighting of the Rangers are sketched along the way, but even those are described in such fashions as to cloak them in an aura of romance. The adventures presented in this war film constitute a recruiting officer's dream.” Crowther added that James Garner's fans “should be completely satisfied…. William Wellman directed. He's the man who directed much better the memorable Battleground.”

Writing for the Sarasota Herald Tribune on June 11, 2011, Christopher Lloyd offered an alternative title for the “alleged war film.. The Star-Crossed Love Lives of Darby’s Rangers.

“Never have I seen a military drama so done in by sex. It’s not enough to say that romance is a recurring distraction in this film; it would be more accurate to describe the battle scenes as interrupting all the mush.”

He praised two combat sequences as “notable because the movie makes extensive use of stock footage from the war, so these are some of the few combat scenes that were actually shot for the movie.” he then cites a scene where groups of soldiers scurry unnoticed in small groups past the treads of a convoy of German tanks, and the climactic battle fought in a “pea soup thick” fog.
