= 4th Ranger Battalion =

- WWII Ranger Battalions' shoulder sleeve insignia
- Active: 1943–1945
- Country: United States of America
- Branch: United States Army
- Type: Special operations forces
- Size: battalion
- Engagements: World War II: Italian campaign

Commanders
- Notable commanders: Roy Murray

The 4th Ranger Battalion was a one-off Ranger unit in the United States Army during World War II. Activated on 29 May 1943 in Tunisia, it was disbanded following the Battle of Cisterna in February 1944. Its lineage was integrated into the 75th Ranger Regiment in 1986 when it was consolidated with the Regiment's active battalions.

== Formation ==
After the success of 1st Ranger Battalion in the North Africa campaign, the Army saw the merit in small special operations forces units. Portions of 1st Ranger Battalion was split into 2nd, 3rd and 4th Ranger Battalions. The battalion was formed from American volunteers in North Africa.

== Training ==
Much like their predecessor, 4th Ranger Battalion had a strict training regimen, directed by William Orlando Darby. 3rd and 4th Battalions trained alongside each other, with members of 1st Battalion acting as training cadre. Passing along the lessons taught by the British 3 Commando Brigade, the Rangers engaged in rough training, including live-fire exercises (an uncommon practice at the time). Major Roy Murray took command of the Rangers as they prepared for their first mission.

== History ==
=== Combat ===
On 10 July 1943, 4th Battalion, along with 1st and 3rd spearheaded Seventh Army's Amphibious Battle of Gela and Licata, beginning the Allied invasion of Sicily. Arriving ahead of the 1st Infantry Division, the Rangers quickly encountered the Italian 4th "Livorno" Division and the Hermann Goering Division.

Facing an overwhelming surprise attack, the Livorno Division surrendered. The Hermann Goering Division was pushed back into the city of Messina where it held off the Allied forces for the remaining German forces to escape.

The Battalion suffered heavy casualties during the Battle of Cisterna. The 4th, along with the 1st and 3rd Ranger Battalion which had been virtually destroyed, were subsequently disbanded.

=== Lineage ===
Its lineage was integrated into the 75th Ranger Regiment in 1986 when it was consolidated with the Regiment's active battalions.

== See also ==
- United States Army Rangers
