= 1st Ranger Battalion =

1st Battalion, 75th Ranger Regiment
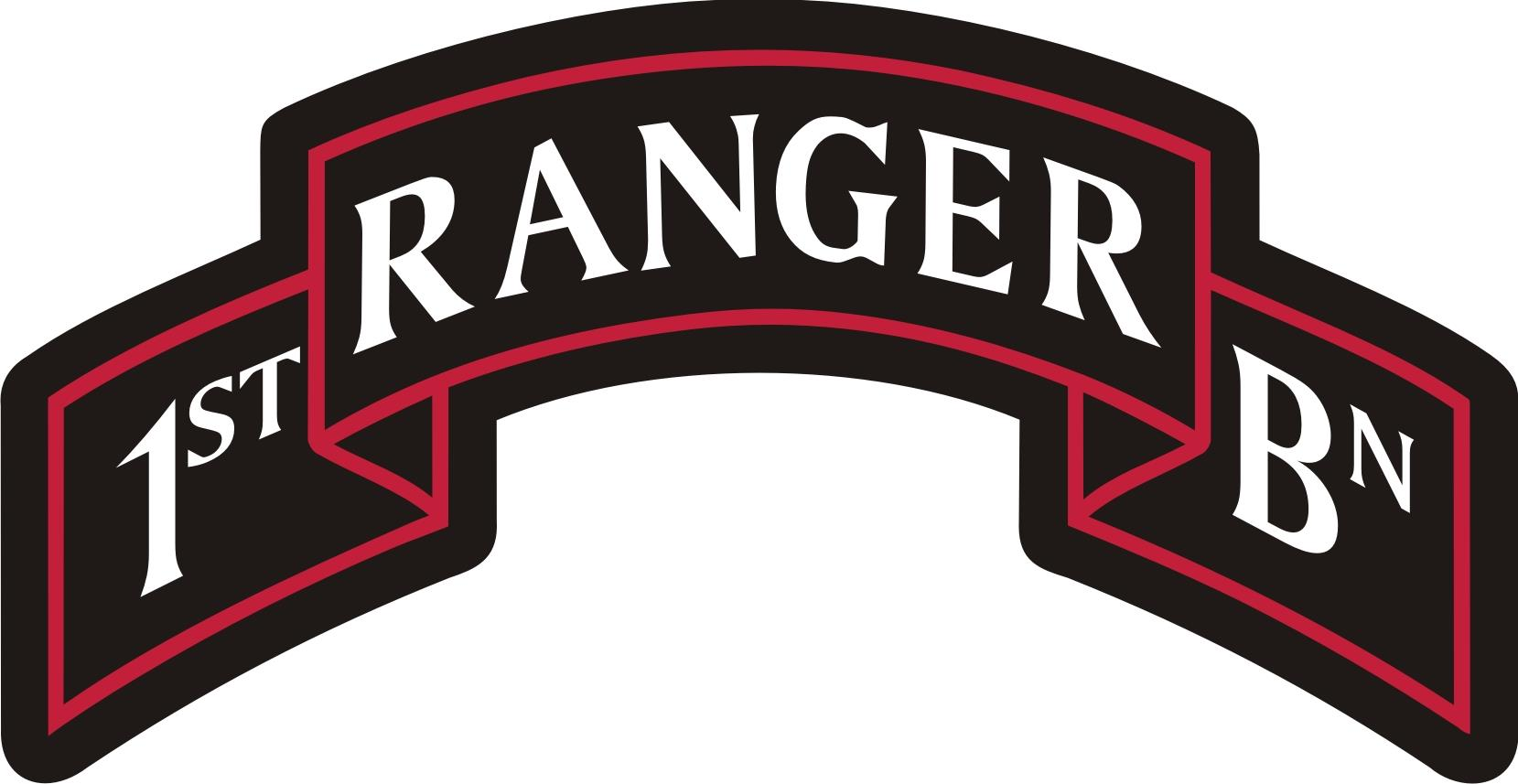
- 1st Ranger Battalion shoulder sleeve insignia
- Active: 1942–44, 1948–51, 1974–present
- Country: United States of America
- Branch: United States Army
- Type: Specialized light infantry
- Role: Special operations
- Size: Battalion
- Part of: 75th Ranger Regiment
- Garrison/HQ: Hunter Army Airfield, Georgia
- Engagements: World War II: North Africa campaign; Italian Campaign; Korean War; Vietnam War; Operation Eagle Claw; Operation Urgent Fury; Operation Just Cause; Gulf War; War on terror: War in Afghanistan; Iraq War; Operation Inherent Resolve

Commanders
- Notable commanders: William Orlando Darby

Insignia
- Distinctive unit insignia

- Unit beret flash

- NATO Map Symbol (1998)

- NATO Map Symbol (2017)

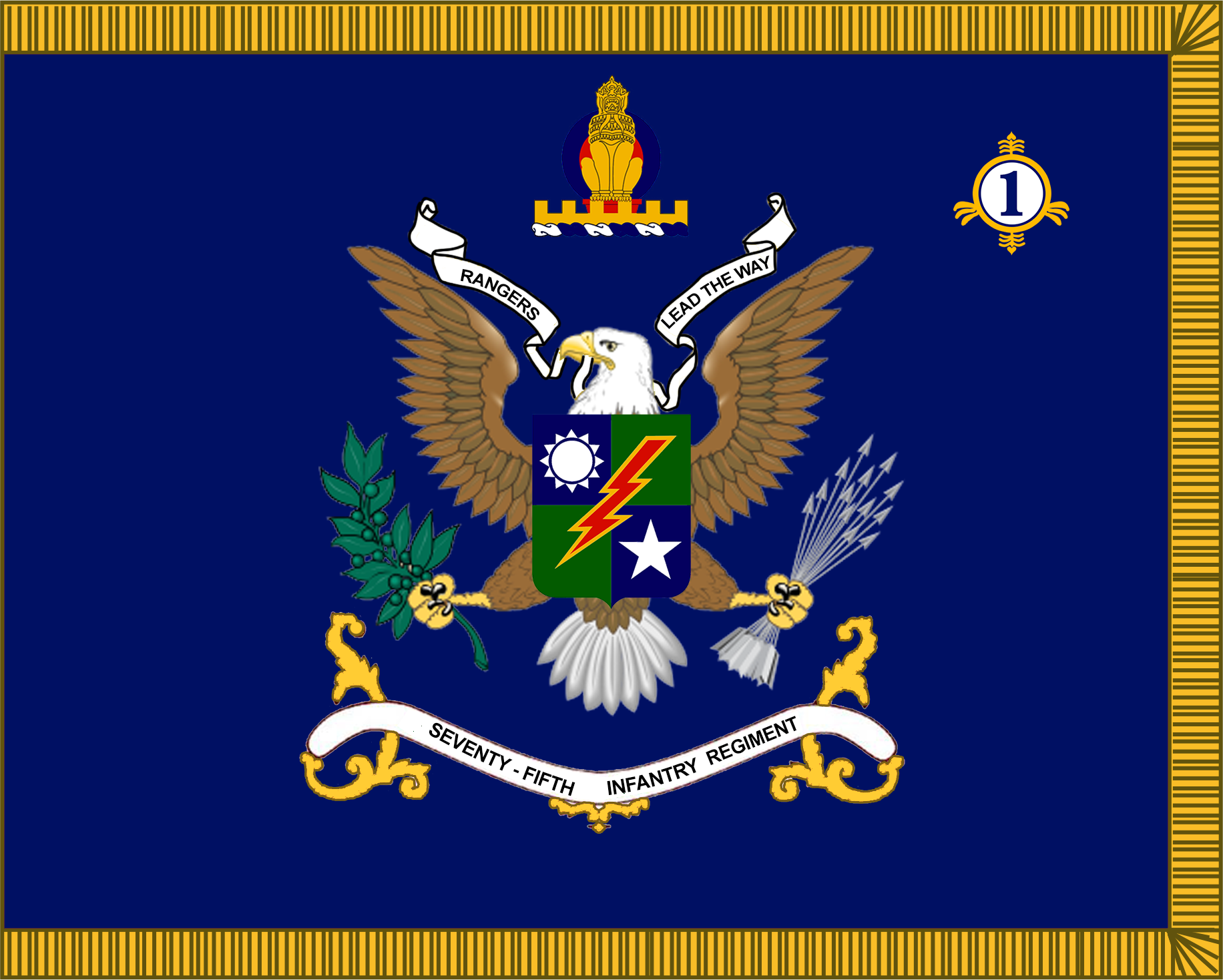
- 75th Ranger Regiment 1st Battalion Flag

The 1st Ranger Battalion is the first of three ranger battalions belonging to the United States Army's 75th Ranger Regiment. It is currently based at Hunter Army Airfield in Savannah, Georgia, United States.

It was originally formed shortly after the United States' entry into World War II and was modeled after the British Commandos during the war. Members from the unit were the first American soldiers to see combat in the European theater when they participated in the failed raid on Dieppe in France in 1942, during which three Rangers were killed and several more were captured. Later, the 1st Ranger Battalion was sent to North Africa, where they participated in the landings in Algeria and the fighting in Tunisia in 1943. Also in 1943 the unit provided training cadre to train two more Ranger battalions between the campaigns in Sicily and the Italian mainland. After World War II, the 1st Ranger Battalion went through a number of changes of name and composition as it has been activated, deactivated, and reorganized on a number of occasions. However, the unit has lived on in one form or another since then, serving in the Korean and Vietnam Wars before being consolidated into the 75th Ranger Regiment of which it is a part today. Deployments have included operations in Syria, Iraq, and Afghanistan as part of the wider global war on terrorism.

== History ==
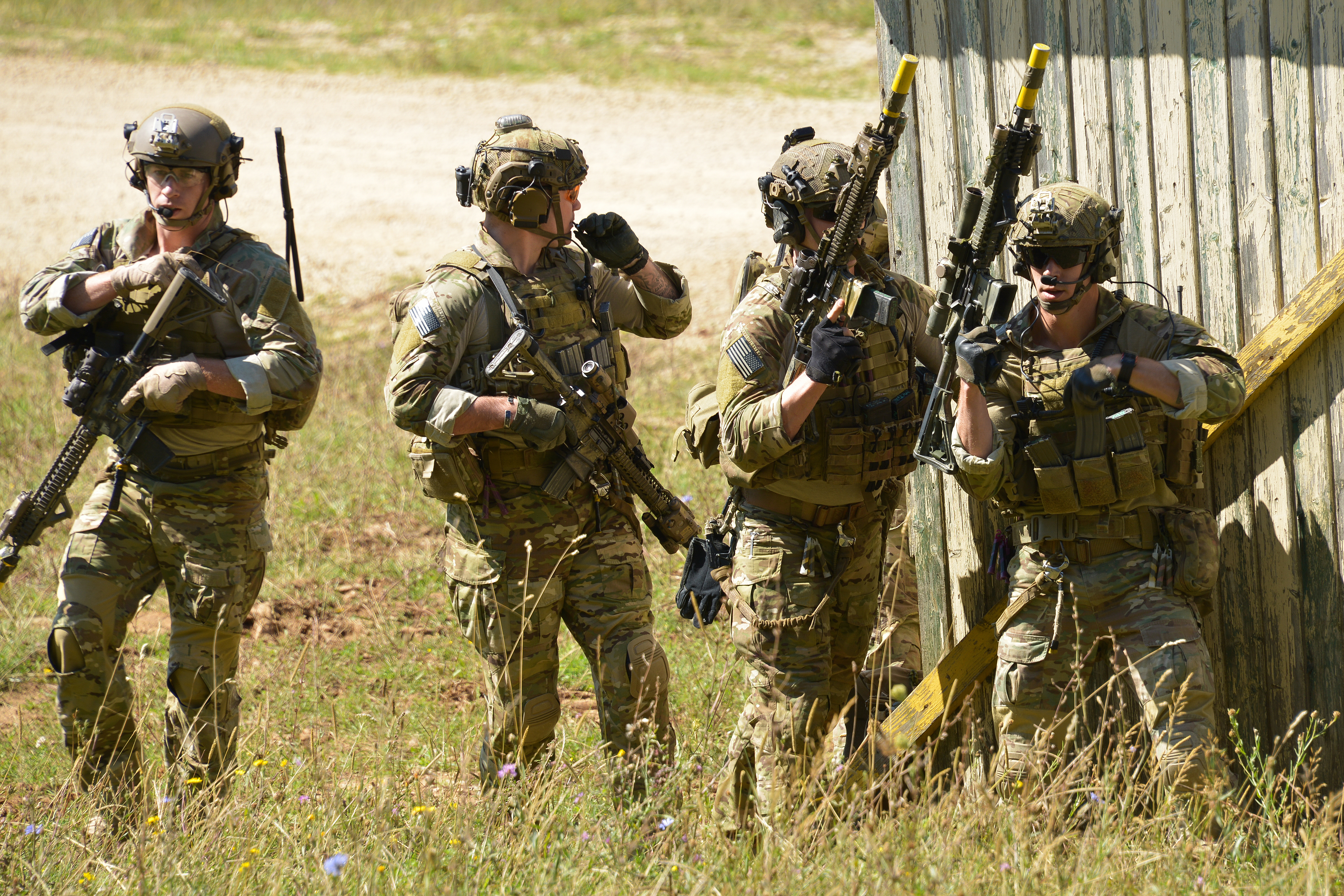
Rangers from 1st Battalion conduct a training raid during Swift Response, a large multinational training exercise held at Hohenfels Training Area, Germany, 26 August 2015.

=== Formation ===
Major General Lucian Truscott, U.S. Army, in liaison with the British General Staff, submitted proposals to General George Marshall that "we undertake immediately an American unit along the lines of the British Commandos" in 1942. A subsequent cable from the U.S. Department of War authorized the activation of the 1st U.S. Army Ranger Battalion.

After much deliberation, Company A, 1st Ranger Battalion was constituted on 27 May 1942. Captain William Orlando Darby, 31-year-old graduate of West Point with amphibious training, was chosen as its commanding officer. Within weeks he was promoted to major for his efforts in organizing the unit. Of the 1,500 men to volunteer for the original Ranger Battalion, only 600 were chosen. Eighty percent of these original Rangers came from the Red Bulls U.S. 34th Infantry Division Darby had most recently been part of. On 19 June 1942, Company A, 1st Ranger Battalion, was officially activated in Carrickfergus, Northern Ireland.

A select team of four officers toured the existing commando training camps and selected the center at Achnacarry, Scotland for the Rangers. Here they underwent intense training. Coached by the battle-seasoned commando instructors (commanded by Lt. Col. Charles Vaughan), the Rangers learned the basics of commando warfare. Five hundred of the 600 volunteers (83.33%) that Darby brought with him to Achnacarry completed the commando training. Many could not endure the exercises; one Ranger was killed, while several others were wounded in realistic training executed under live fire.

=== World War II ===
==== 1st Battalion goes active ====
The first Americans to see active combat in the European theater of World War II were forty-four enlisted men and five officers from the 1st Ranger Battalion. Dispersed among the Canadians and the British commandos, these men were the first American ground soldiers to see action against the Germans in the disastrous Dieppe Raid, officially known as Operation Jubilee. Three Rangers were killed, including Lieutenant E. V. Loustalot (the first American soldier killed in Europe in World War II), and several captured. During the mission, the British Captain leading the assault was killed. Loustalot took command and, with his men, attacked a clifftop machine gun nest. Scaling the steep cliff, Loustalot was wounded three times before being killed by enemy crossfire.

==== North Africa ====
Attempting to prevent German occupation of seaports in North Africa, the 1st Ranger Battalion spearheaded an invasion at the Port of Arzew in Algeria. This was accomplished by executing a surprise night amphibious landing, silencing two gun batteries, and opening the way for the capture of Oran.

In Tunisia in 1943, the 1st Battalion executed the first Ranger behind-enemy-lines night raid for the purpose of gaining information and terrorizing the enemy. On 11 February, 12 Rangers crossed 32 miles (51 km) on foot for their first raid at an Italian camp at Sened Station. Using the cloak of night, the Rangers slipped to within 50 yards (46 m) of the Italian outpost and began their attack. It took the battalion only 20 minutes to achieve area control. Fifty enemy were killed and an additional 10 were taken prisoner. Darby, along with fellow commanders, was awarded the Silver Star for this victory and the battalion itself gained the nickname the "Black Death" by the Italians. Later, in March, American units were being decimated time and again while trying to break through the critical mountain pass at Djbel Ank. Given this mission, the 1st Rangers undertook a twelve-mile (19 km) night march through rugged terrain to reach the heights of Djbel Ank where, at dawn, the Rangers surprised the enemy from the rear, capturing two hundred prisoners and giving General Patton an opening though which he began the final and victorious battle in North Africa. Rangers played a crucial role in the battle of El Guettar which immediately followed, for which the First Ranger Battalion won its first Presidential Unit Citation (US).

==== Sicily and Italy ====
The early success of the 1st Ranger Battalion brought about the creation of the 3rd and 4th Battalions. The original 1st Battalion was divided into thirds. One third of the headquarters and one company were placed in each of the Battalions 1-3-4. 3rd Ranger Battalion was activated on 21 May 1943 at Nemours, Morocco, while 4th Ranger Battalion was activated on 29 May 1943 in Tunisia. The 1st, 3rd, and 4th Battalions were known as Darby's Rangers. To provide command and control for these three Ranger Battalions, the 6615th Ranger Force (Provisional) was established. This force was rounded out with the addition of the 83rd Chemical Mortar Battalion, and the 2/509th Parachute Infantry Regiment. The battle-seasoned 1st Battalion moved into their newly assigned positions and trained their Ranger colleagues. The 1-3-4 Battalions were trained under Darby in Nemours, Morocco and prepared for the invasion of Sicily and Italy. Following the 1st Ranger Battalion success at the amphibious battle of Gela, all four of the initial Ranger Battalions were redesignated as Ranger Infantry Battalions on 1 August 1943

Had it not been for the accomplishments of the 1st Ranger Battalion in the early entry of WWII, there would be no Rangers today. Their successful invasions in North Africa opened the sea and its ports for the Allied forces. The Allies were then able to move ships and equipment to support subsequent campaigns, enabling the later forces to successfully infiltrate enemy lines along the African coast, in Sicily, and up into Italy.

The Ranger Force attacked Salerno on 9 September 1943, and participated in the Naples-Foggia Campaign. They then moved on to Anzio on 22 January 1944. The entire 6615th Ranger Force (Provisional) was destroyed behind enemy lines in a heavily outnumbered encounter at Cisterna, Italy on 30 January 1944, and was officially disbanded on 15 August 1944. The 4th Ranger Battalion suffered some casualties while attempting to break through enemy lines to rescue their comrades in the 1st and 3rd Battalions.

==== Postwar ====
The 1st Ranger Infantry Battalion, in response to parallel missions in Berlin, was reconstituted on 1 September 1948 as Company A, 1st Infantry Battalion, and activated in the Canal Zone. It served there until it was inactivated on 4 January 1950.

=== Korea ===
The outbreak of hostilities in Korea in June 1950 again signaled the need for Rangers. Colonel John Gibson Van Houten was selected by the Army Chief of Staff to head the Ranger training program at Ft. Benning, Georgia. 1st Ranger Infantry Company (Airborne) inherited its lineage from Company A, 1st Infantry Battalion and departed from Ft. Benning, Georgia on 15 November 1950, and arrived in Korea on 17 December 1950, where it was attached to the 2nd Infantry Division. The 1st Ranger Infantry Company (Airborne) opened with an extraordinary example of land navigation, then executed a daring night raid 9 miles (14 km) behind enemy lines destroying an enemy complex. The enemy installation was later identified by a prisoner as the headquarters of the 12th North Korean Division. Caught by surprise and unaware of the size of the American force, two North Korean Regiments hastily withdrew from the area. The 1st Company was in the middle of the major battle of Chipyong-Ni and the "May Massacre." It was awarded two Distinguished Unit Citations.

As a result of budgetary considerations, the US Army spent much of the 1950s and 1960s consolidating and redesignating units that were on inactive status.

Elements of the unit was redesignated 15 April 1960 in the Regular Army; concurrently consolidated with Company B, 1st Ranger Infantry Battalion (activated 19 June 1942), and consolidated unit redesignated as Headquarters and Headquarters Company, 1st Special Forces Group, 1st Special Forces.

On 24 November 1952 as Company A, 1st Ranger Infantry Battalion, in inactive status and was consolidated on 15 April 1960 with the A Company, 1st Battalion, 1st Regiment, 1st Special Service Force, and the consolidated unit was redesignated as Headquarters and Headquarters Company, 7th Special Forces Group(SFG), 1st Special Forces. The unit was further consolidated 6 June 1960 with Headquarters and Headquarters Company, 7th Special Forces Group, and the consolidated unit was designated as Headquarters and Headquarters Company, 7th SFG, 1st SF (organic elements constituted 20 May 1960 and activated 6 June 1960).

=== Vietnam ===
On 1 January 1969, under the new U.S. Army Combat Arms Regimental System (CARS), U.S. Army Rangers were re-formed in South Vietnam as the 75th Infantry Regiment (Ranger). Fifteen companies of Rangers, two of which (A-75 & B-75) were based in the US, were raised from units that had been performing missions in Europe since the late 1950s and in Vietnam since 1966 as Long Range Reconnaissance Patrol and Long Range Patrol companies.

=== Post-Vietnam ===
After the Vietnam War, division and brigade commanders determined that the U.S. Army needed an elite, rapid deployment, light infantry, so in 1974 General Creighton Abrams charged General Kenneth C. Leuer with the task of activating, organizing, training, and leading the first battalion sized Ranger unit since World War II. The 1st Battalion was activated under the 75th Infantry Regiment (Ranger) on 31 January 1974. It received its colors and lineage from the Vietnam War Company C, 75th Infantry, which traced back through Company C, 475th back to the 5307th Composite unit, also known as Merrill's Marauders. Because of its success the 2nd Battalion was constituted eight months later. In 1984 the 3rd Battalion and their regimental headquarters were created. On 3 February 1986, the 1st Battalion, 75th Infantry was consolidated with the former Company A, 1st Ranger Battalion (which had been consolidated as the HHC of 7th SFG since 1960) thus gaining the lineage of the World War II era 1st Battalion. As a result, the unit was redesignated the 1st Battalion. Concurrently, the 2nd and 3rd Battalions were also consolidated with other past Ranger battalions and the regiment as a whole was redesignated the 75th Ranger Regiment.

The 1st Ranger Battalion has participated in the following operations: Operation Eagle Claw, the 1980 rescue attempt of American hostages in Tehran, Iran; Operation Urgent Fury, the invasion of Grenada in 1983; Operation Just Cause, the U.S. invasion of Panama in 1989; Bravo Company was deployed in the First Persian Gulf War (Operations Desert Storm and Desert Shield) in 1991; all three battalions were to be deployed to Haiti in 1994 (before the operation's cancellation only 5 miles (8.0 km) from the Haitian coast).

=== War on terror ===
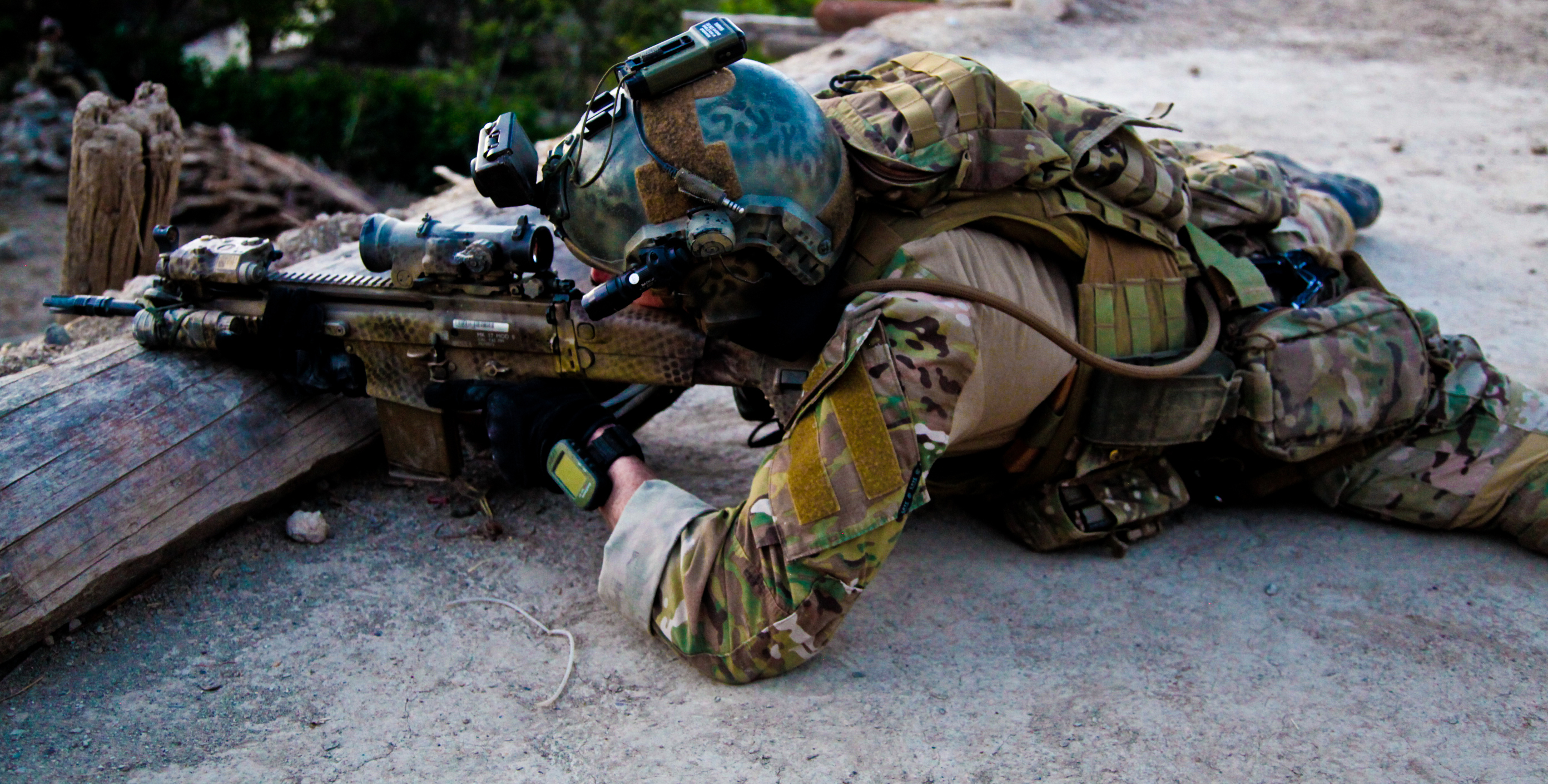
A Ranger from 1st Ranger Battalion scans for insurgents during a combat operation in Afghanistan, 17 April 2013

In December 2001, following the events of 9/11, elements of Headquarters Company and Company A deployed in support of Operation Enduring Freedom in Afghanistan. In 2002, the entire battalion returned to Afghanistan to support the continuing global war on terrorism. In March 2002, during Operation Anaconda, 35 Rangers from the battalion had been assigned as QRF for all Task Force 11 operations, but only half of the platoon was available for the Battle of Takur Ghar.

In 2003, 1st Battalion participated in combat operations in support of Iraq War, conducting missions across the entire country of Iraq. 290 Rangers from 1/75th and 2/75th distinguished themselves during the successful rescue of prisoner-of-war, PFC Jessica Lynch.

For actions between 14 and 16 November 2010, Charlie Company received the Valorous Unit Award for extraordinary heroism, combat achievement and conspicuous gallantry while executing combat operations in support of a named operation. The battalion received the Meritorious Unit Citation and Bravo Company, in particular, the Valorous Unit Award, for actions in support of Operation Enduring Freedom between 15 May – 28 August 2011 that included: conducting continuous combat operations, including time sensitive raids and deliberate movement to contact operations while in enemy held terrain out of reach by other friendly forces, in places like Khost, Paktika, and Nangarhar Province.

As of March 2019, the battalion has made 22 deployments during the Global War on Terrorism. During one deployment to Afghanistan in 2018, the battalion took part in 198 combat operations in which 1,900 terrorists were killed or captured, with 14 rangers being awarded for valor, including SFC Christopher Celiz who was awarded the Medal of Honor.

== Honors ==
=== Campaign participation credit ===
==== World War II ====
- Algeria–French Morocco (with arrowhead)
- Tunisia
- Sicily (with arrowhead)
- Naples–Foggia (with arrowhead)
- Anzio (with arrowhead)
- Rome–Arno

==== Korean War ====
- CCF Intervention
- First UN Counteroffensive
- CCF Spring Offensive
- UN Summer–Fall Offensive

==== Vietnam ====
- Counteroffensive, Phase VI
- Tet 69/Counteroffensive
- Summer–Fall 1969
- Winter–Spring 1970
- Sanctuary Counteroffensive
- Counteroffensive, Phase VII
- Consolidation I

==== Armed Forces Expeditions ====
- Grenada (with arrowhead)
- Panama (with arrowhead)
- Haiti

==== Global war on terror ====
- GWOT (expeditionary)
- Afghanistan Service Medal
- Iraq Service Medal
- Valorous Unit Award
- Joint Meritorious Unit Award

=== Decorations ===
- Presidential Unit Citation (Army) for the Battle of El Guettar
- Presidential Unit Citation (Army) for SALERNO
- Presidential Unit Citation (Army) for Pointe Du Hoc
- Presidential Unit Citation (Army) for SAAR RIVER AREA
- Presidential Unit Citation (Army) for MYITKYINA
- Presidential Unit Citation (Army) for CHIPYONG-NI
- Presidential Unit Citation (Army) for HONGCHON
- Valorous Unit Award for VIETNAM – II CORPS AREA
- Valorous Unit Award for GRENADA
- Joint Meritorious Unit Award for PANAMA
- Republic of Vietnam Cross of Gallantry with Palm for VIETNAM 1969–1970
- Republic of Vietnam Cross of Gallantry with Palm for VIETNAM 1970–1971
- Republic of Vietnam Civil Action Honor Medal, First Class for VIETNAM 1969–1971
- Presidential Unit Citation (Army) for Afghanistan
- Valorous Unit Award for Iraq

== Notable members ==
- Sergeant Major Thomas Payne, Medal of Honor recipient for actions during a mission that rescued 70 Iraqi prisoners from an ISIL prison in Kirkuk Province, Iraq, 2015. Previously with Company A, 1st Ranger Battalion, Payne was a member of Delta Force during the raid. He was initially awarded the Distinguished Service Cross which was later upgraded to the Medal of Honor in 2020, making him the first living Delta Force Medal of Honor recipient, and first Medal of Honor recipient for Operation Inherent Resolve. He was also the winner of the Best Ranger Competition in 2012.
- Captain Nate Self: Former commanding officer of 1st Platoon, Company A, 1st Ranger Battalion. He was deployed to Afghanistan shortly after 9/11. Self commanded a Quick Reaction Force for Operation Anaconda. He and half of his platoon were on 2 Chinooks on the mission to rescue missing DEVGRU Red Squadron Navy SEAL Neil Roberts and USAF Combat Controller John Chapman during the Battle of Takur Ghar. For his actions during the battle he was awarded the Silver Star, Bronze Star, and Purple Heart.
- Captain Alejandro Villanueva, retired NFL player. Served with the 2nd Battalion, 87th Infantry Regiment and later 1st Ranger Battalion before starting his career in the NFL, with multiple deployments to Afghanistan.
- Sergeant Major of the Army Glen E. Morrell, former 1st Ranger Battalion command sergeant major and served as the Sergeant Major of the Army from 1983 to 1987.
- Sergeant First Class Christopher Celiz, posthumous Medal of Honor recipient.
- Peter Kassig, a former Ranger with 1st Ranger Battalion, 75th Ranger Regiment; later became an aid worker in Syria. He was taken hostage by The Islamic State, and ultimately beheaded.
- Peter D. Huntley, Commander of MARSOC. Prior to commissioning as a Marine officer, served as an enlisted soldier with 1st Ranger Battalion.

== See also ==
- Rogers' Rangers
- United States Army Rangers
- Ranger Creed
- Ranger School
- Darby's Rangers (1958 film)
