= Allied Armies in Italy =

Highest Allied field headquarters in Italy in WWII

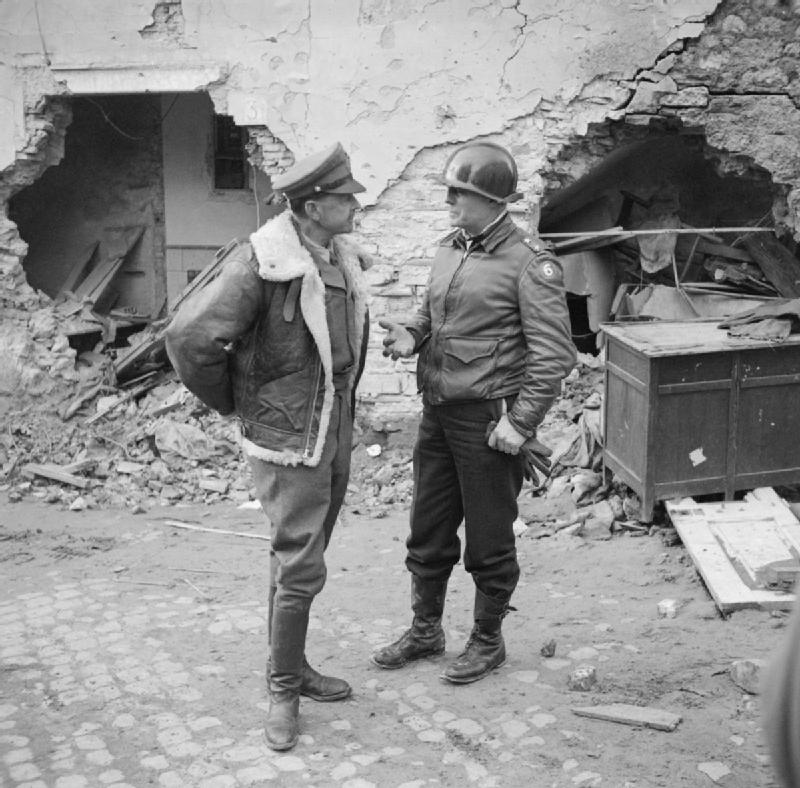
The commander of the Allied Armies in Italy, General Sir Harold Alexander, with American Major General Lucian Truscott, in charge of the Allied bridgehead at Anzio, 4 March 1944.

The Allied Armies in Italy (AAI) was the title of the highest Allied field headquarters in Italy, during the middle part of the Italian campaign of World War II. In the early and later stages of the campaign the headquarters was known as the 15th Army Group; it reported to the Joint Allied command Allied Forces Headquarters (AFHQ), the theatre command for the Mediterranean theatre.

The 15th Army Group was renamed the Allied forces in Italy on 11 January 1944, then Allied Central Mediterranean Force on 18 January 1944 and finally the Allied Armies in Italy on 9 March 1944. The 15th Army Group was commanded by General Sir Harold R. L. G. Alexander until 11 December 1944. Lieutenant General Mark W. Clark, formerly the commander of the U.S. Fifth Army, then took command and the headquarters title was changed back to the 15th Army Group.

The AAI thus controlled the Allied land forces for some of the hardest fighting of the entire war. Operations carried out included: the long stalemate on the Gustav Line with the hard-fought battles of Monte Cassino; the Anzio landings; the liberation of Rome; the assault on the Gothic Line, Operation OLIVE; and ending with Operation GRAPESHOT, in which the 15th Army Group struck again just south of the Po valley.

For all of its life the command consisted of the American Fifth Army, under Lieutenant General Clark and, from December 1944, Lieutenant General Lucian Truscott, and the British Eighth Army, under Lieutenant General Sir Oliver W. H. Leese and, from October 1944, Lieutenant General Sir Richard L. McCreery.
