= Lucian Truscott =

United States Army general (1895–1965)

Lucian Truscott Jr.
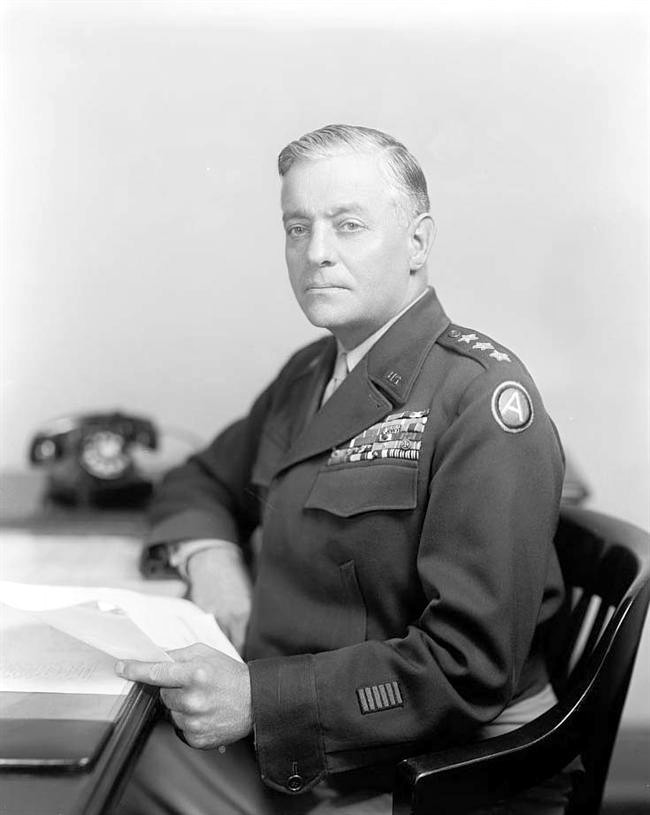
- Truscott between 1944–46
- Born: 9 January 1895; Chatfield, Texas, United States
- Died: 12 September 1965 (aged 70); Alexandria, Virginia, United States
- Relatives: Lucian Truscott IV (grandson)
- Military career
- Allegiance: United States
- Branch: United States Army
- Service years: 1917–1947
- Rank: General
- Service number: 0-7096
- Unit: Cavalry Branch
- Commands: Third United States Army; Fifth United States Army; Fifteenth United States Army; VI Corps; 3rd Infantry Division; 5th Cavalry Regiment
- Conflicts: World War I World War II
- Awards: Distinguished Service Cross; Army Distinguished Service Medal (3); Navy Distinguished Service Medal; Legion of Merit; Purple Heart
- Other work: Central Intelligence Agency – senior agent Germany, later Deputy Director for Coordination; Author

General Lucian King Truscott Jr. (9 January 1895 – 12 September 1965) was a highly decorated senior United States Army officer, who saw distinguished active service during World War II. Between 1943–1945, he successively commanded the 3rd Infantry Division, VI Corps, Fifteenth Army and Fifth Army, serving mainly in the Mediterranean Theater of Operations (MTO) during his wartime service. He and Alexander Patch were the only U.S. Army officers to command a division, a corps, and a field army in combat during the war.

== Early life and family ==
Truscott was born in Chatfield, Texas on 6 January 1895, a son of Lucian King Truscott (1861–1922) and Maria Temple (Tully) Truscott (1866–1938). Raised primarily in Oklahoma, he attended grade school and a year of high school in the hamlet of Stella, near Norman. At age 16, he claimed to be 18 and a high school graduate to qualify for teacher training, attended the summer term of the state normal school in Norman, and received his teaching certification. He taught school and worked as a school principal before he decided to join the United States Army in 1917. Enlisting during the American entry into World War I, Truscott applied for officer training, falsely claiming to be a high school graduate who had completed the equivalent of a year of college. After completing the officer training camp at Fort Logan H. Roots, in October 1917 he was commissioned a second lieutenant in the Cavalry Branch of the U.S. Army. During the war, he remained in the United States to patrol the border with Mexico, and served with the 17th Cavalry Regiment at Camp Harry J. Jones, Douglas, Arizona.

On 27 March 1919, Truscott married Sarah "Chick" Nicholas Randolph (1896–1974), a descendant of Thomas Jefferson Randolph and Thomas Nelson Jr. They were the parents of three children – Mary Randolph Truscott (1920–1991), Lucian King (1921–2000), and James Joseph (b. 1930–2020).

== Military career ==
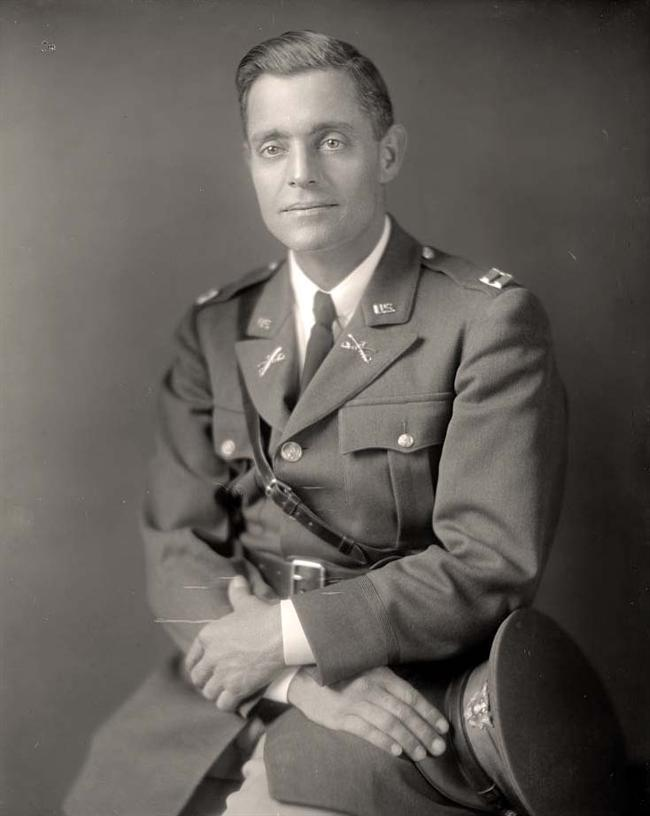
Truscott as a captain during the interwar period.

Truscott served in various cavalry and staff assignments between the wars, including completion of the Cavalry Officers Course, followed by assignment as a Cavalry School instructor. He also graduated from the United States Army Command and General Staff College, followed by assignment to its faculty. In the early 1930s, he commanded E Troop, 3rd Cavalry Regiment, which was stationed at Fort Myer, Virginia. On 18 August 1940 he was promoted to lieutenant colonel.

=== World War II ===
In March 1941, Truscott was appointed to the staff of Ninth Corps Area, at Fort Lewis, Washington. It was while he was in this assignment where he came into close contact with Dwight D. Eisenhower, then a colonel serving in the 3rd Infantry Division (then stationed at Fort Lewis) as a battalion commander.

In 1942, Truscott, now a temporary colonel (having been promoted on 24 December 1941), was instrumental in developing an American commando unit patterned after the British Commandos. The American unit was activated by Truscott (newly promoted to the rank of brigadier general on 19 June 1942) as the 1st Ranger Battalion, and placed under the command of Major William Orlando Darby.

In May 1942, Truscott was assigned to the Allied Combined Staff under Lord Louis Mountbatten and in August, he was the primary U.S. observer on the Dieppe Raid. The raid was primarily a Canadian operation, consisting of elements of the 2nd Canadian Infantry Division, with two British Commandos attached along with a 50-man detachment from the 1st Ranger Battalion. The Rangers were assigned to No. 3 Commando, No. 4 Commando, and 6 Rangers were spread out among the Canadian regiments. This was considered the first action by American troops against German forces in World War II.

On 8 November 1942, now a major general, Truscott led the 9,000 men of the 60th Infantry Regiment (part of the 9th Infantry Division) and 66th Armored Regiment (part of the 2nd Armored Division) in the landings at Mehdia and Port Lyautey in Morocco, part of Operation Torch under Major General George S. Patton.

==== Division commander ====
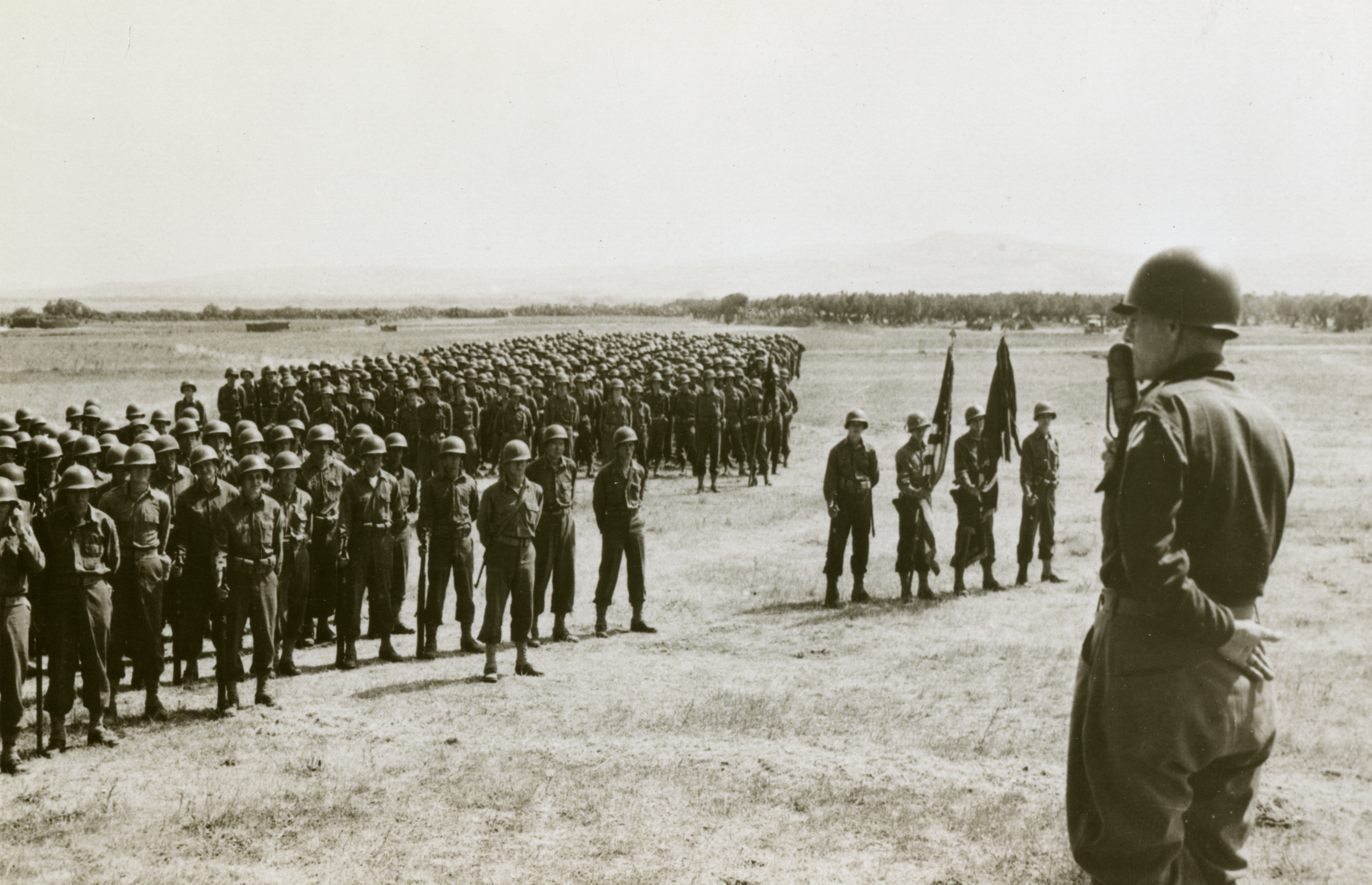
Major General Lucian K. Truscott speaking to men of his 3rd Division outdoors, North Africa, 1943.

Truscott took command of the 3rd Infantry Division in March 1943, and oversaw preparations for the Allied invasion of Sicily, codenamed Operation Husky. He was known as a very tough trainer, bringing the 3rd Infantry Division up to a very high standard. At the age of 48, he was one of the youngest division commanders in the U.S. Army at the time.

The general would transform the members of the 3rd Infantry Division, one of the army's oldest, in his crucible so that they could meet the challenges ahead. He was confident that the better he trained each soldier, the more likely it was that that man would one day make it home.

He led the division in the assault on Sicily in July 1943, coming under the command of the Seventh U.S. Army, commanded by Patton, now a lieutenant general. Here his training paid off when the division covered great distances in the mountainous terrain at high speed. The famous 'Truscott Trot' was a marching pace of five miles per hour over the first mile, thereafter four miles per hour, much faster than the usual standard of 2.5 miles per hour. The 3rd Infantry Division was considered to be the best-trained, best-led division in the Seventh Army and Truscott himself was highly rated by Patton, who wrote in an officer efficiency report, stating that, "I know of no other major general who has more efficiently performed as a Division Commander." He rated Truscott 5th out of 155 general officers.

After a brief rest to absorb replacements the division, in mid-September, nine days after the initial Allied landings at Salerno, Italy, came ashore on the Italian mainland, where it fought its way up the Italian peninsula, under the command of the VI Corps, commanded by Major General John P. Lucas. The VI Corps was part of Lieutenant General Mark W. Clark's United States Fifth Army. After crossing the Volturno Line in October and fighting in severe winter weather around the Gustav Line, which saw heavy casualties sustained, the division was pulled out of the line for rest and relaxation.

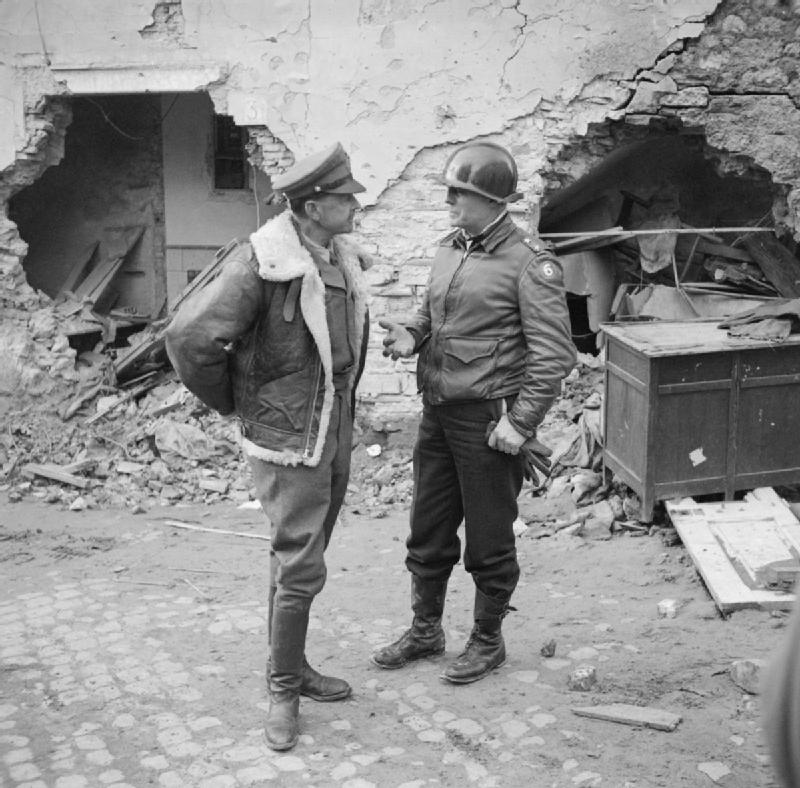
General Sir Harold R. L. G. Alexander, Commander-in-Chief (C-in-C) of the Allied Armies in Italy (AAI), with Major General Lucian K. Truscott Jr., commander of the U.S. VI Corps, in the Anzio beachhead, Italy, 4 March 1944

In January 1944, the division assaulted Anzio as part of the U.S. VI Corps, which also included the British 1st Infantry Division, along with two British Commandos and three battalions of U.S. Army Rangers, Combat Command B of the 1st Armored Division and the 504th Parachute Regimental Combat Team. The operation, the brainchild of British Prime Minister Winston Churchill, was intended to outflank, and potentially force the Germans to withdraw from their Winter Line defenses, which had considerably slowed Allied progress in Italy.

==== Corps commander ====
Lucas, the corps commander, initially decided not to push inland, as Allied commanders had intended, and Truscott's 3rd Division was soon engaged in bitter fighting and, again, suffering heavy losses as the Germans launched numerous counterattacks to drive the Allies into the sea. With Clark, the Fifth Army commander, and General Sir Harold R. L. G. Alexander, commander-in-chief (C-in-C) of the Allied Armies in Italy (AAI), growing increasingly worried about the situation, Truscott was appointed as Lucas's deputy commander and, after Lucas was relieved on 17 February, Truscott assumed command. Truscott was succeeded in command of the 3rd Infantry Division by Major General John "Iron Mike" O'Daniel, previously the assistant division commander (ADC). At the age of 49, Truscott was the second youngest corps commander in the U.S. Army at the time, behind only Major General J. Lawton Collins, then commanding VII Corps in England. Clark, writing in his memoirs after the war, claimed that he "selected Truscott to become the new VI Corps commander because of all the division commanders available to me in the Anzio bridgehead who were familiar with the situation he was the most outstanding. A quiet, competent, and courageous officer with great battle experience through North Africa, Sicily, and Italy, he inspired confidence in all with whom he came in contact."

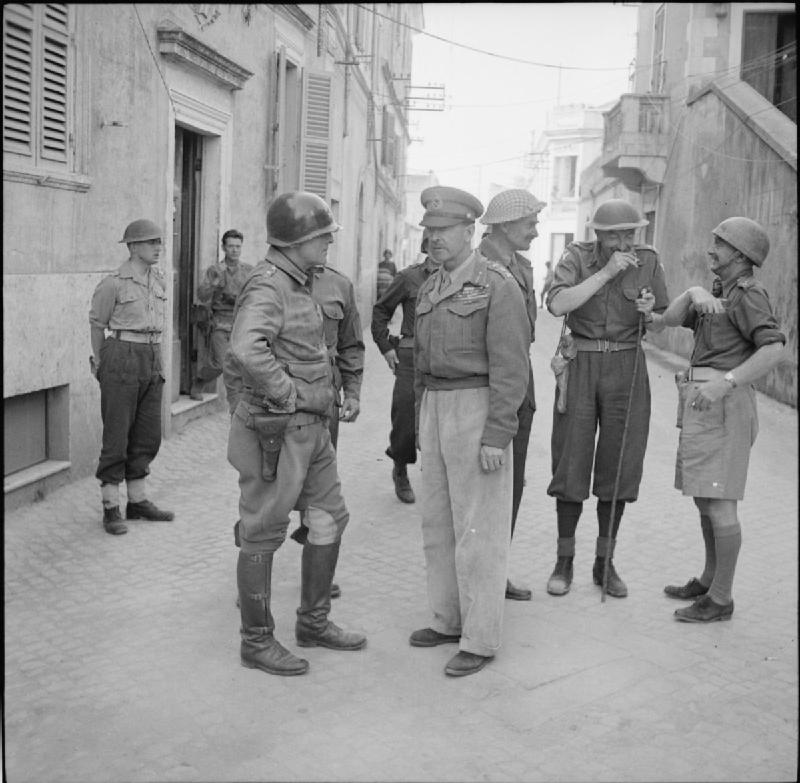
General Sir Harold Alexander with Major General Lucian Truscott and other senior Allied commanders at Anzio, Italy, 5 May 1944. Major General John Hawkesworth is pictured on the far right wearing a parachutist helmet, and to the left of him is Major General Philip Gregson-Ellis.

Following Anzio, Truscott continued to command VI Corps through the fighting up the Italian boot, helping in the final Battle of Monte Cassino and the subsequent capture of Rome, just two days before the Normandy landings. However, his command was then withdrawn from the line to prepare for Operation Dragoon, the amphibious assault on southern France.

General Alphonse Juin with American generals Geoffrey Keyes, Mark W. Clark, Alfred M. Gruenther, and Lucian Truscott, at Rome City Hall on June 5, 1944.

On 15 August 1944, VI Corps landed in southern France and initially faced relatively little opposition. The rapid retreat of the German Nineteenth Army resulted in swift gains for the Allied forces. The invasion plan was initially for US forces to conduct the initial landing, and Free French forces to conduct the breakout. This was changed to exploit the withdrawal of the German 19th Army, and US VI Corps began a pursuit. This resulted in cutting off the escape of the enemy, and their total destruction or capture. The Dragoon force met up with southern thrusts from Operation Overlord in mid-September, near Dijon.

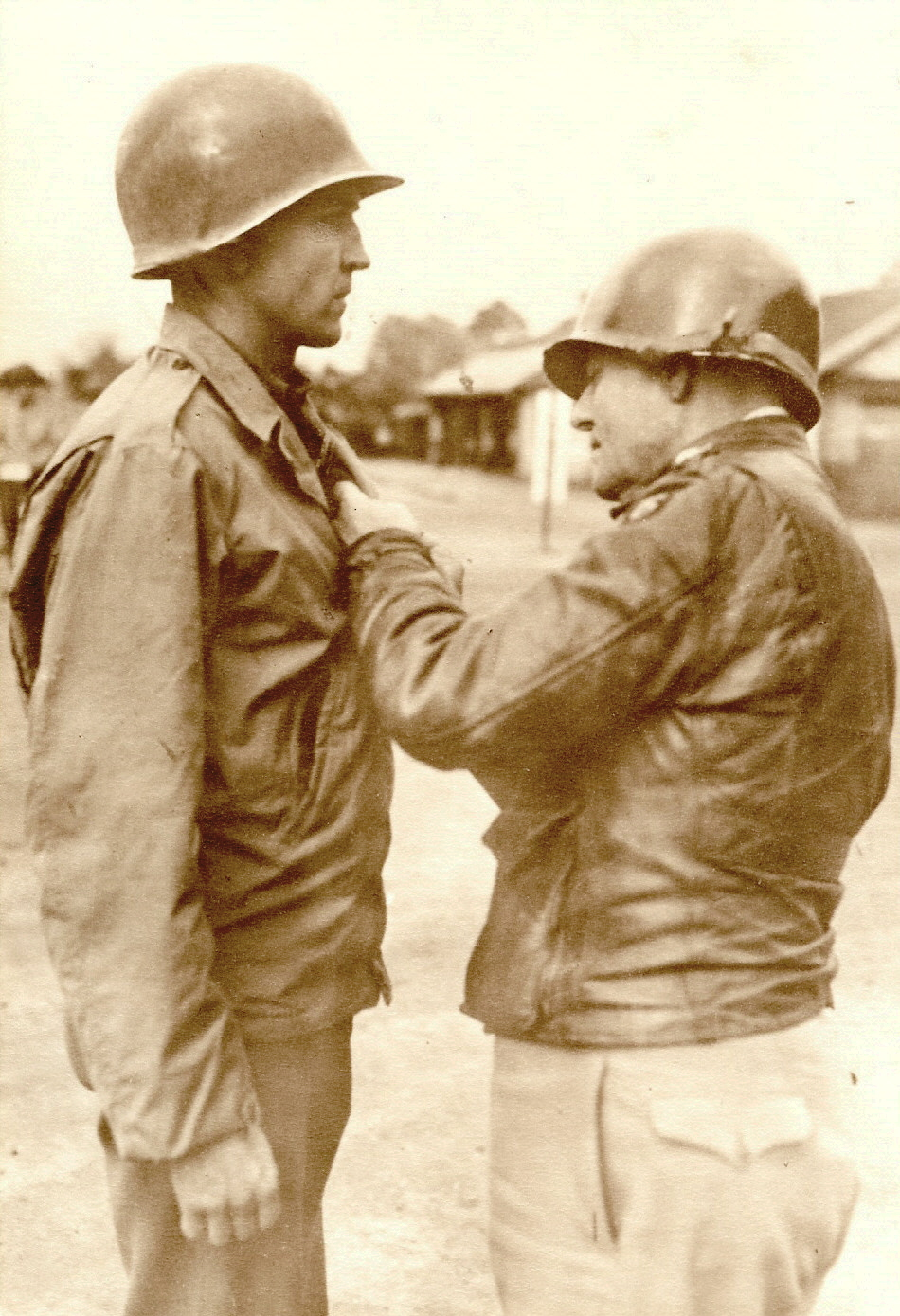
Truscott pins the Bronze Star on Captain Richard Wolfer, France, 25 October 1944

A planned benefit of Dragoon was the usefulness of the port of Marseille. The rapid Allied advance after Operation Cobra and Dragoon slowed almost to a halt in September 1944 due to a critical lack of supplies, as thousands of tons of supplies were shunted to northwest France to compensate for the inadequacies of port facilities and land transport in northern Europe. Marseille and the southern French railways were brought back into service despite heavy damage to the port of Marseille and its railroad trunk lines. They became a significant supply route for the Allied advance into Germany, providing about a third of the Allied needs.

==== Army commander ====
On 2 September 1944, Truscott was promoted to the three-star rank of lieutenant general and in October he was appointed temporary commander of the newly formed Fifteenth Army, which was largely an administrative and training command. Truscott and his staff established an advanced command post for the Fifteenth Army at Dinant, Belgium. Truscott left Belgium to assume command of the Fifth Army in Italy on or about 3 December. The advance party of the Fifteenth Army headquarters arrived in Dinant on 14 December. Fifteenth Army became operational when Major General (soon to be lieutenant general) Leonard T. Gerow assumed command on 15 January 1945.

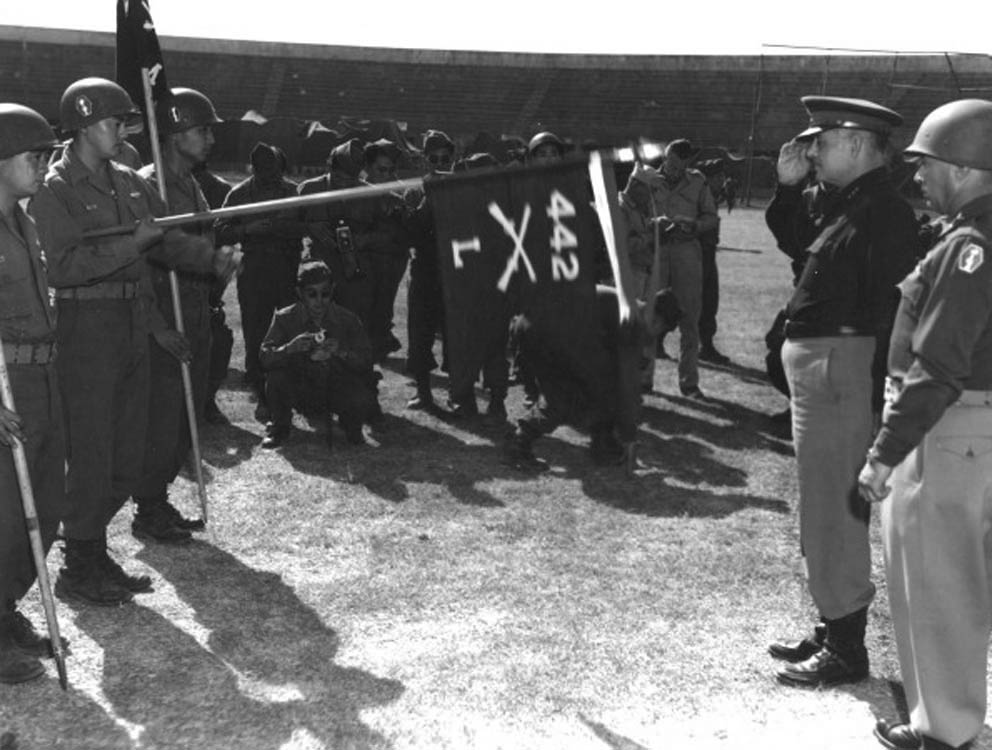
Truscott decorates Japanese American soldiers of Company 'L' of the 3rd Battalion, 442nd Regimental Combat Team with the Presidential Unit Citation, 4 September 1945

Truscott's next command came in December 1944. He was promoted to command of the U.S. Fifth Army in Italy when its commander Lieutenant General Mark Clark was made commander of the Allied 15th Army Group, formerly the Allied Armies in Italy (AAI). Truscott led the Fifth Army through the hard winter of 1944–1945, where many of its formations were in exposed positions in the mountains of Italy. He then led the army through the Allied Spring 1945 offensive in Italy culminating in the final destruction of the German forces in Italy.

== Post-war era ==
Truscott took over command of the Third Army from General George S. Patton on 8 October 1945, and led it until April 1946. This command included the Eastern Military District of the U.S. occupation zone of Germany, which consisted primarily of the state of Bavaria. When the Seventh Army was deactivated in March 1946, Truscott's Third Army took over the Western Military District (the U.S.-occupied parts of Baden, Württemberg and Hesse-Darmstadt). Truscott was reassigned in April 1946 and retired from the army on September 30, 1947.

Will Lang Jr. from Life wrote a biography on Truscott that appeared in the October 2, 1944, issue of that magazine.

After leaving the United States Army, Truscott began work on his book Command Missions, which was published in 1954 (ISBN 0-89141-364-2), and The Twilight of the U.S. Cavalry (ISBN 0-7006-0932-6). The latter book was published after his death by his son, Lucian III, in 1989. In 1954, Congress passed Public Law 83-508, which promoted several World War II senior officers who had exercised responsibilities greater than their rank; as a numbered army commander, Truscott carried out the duties of a four-star general, and the 1954 law promoted him to general on the retired list.

Truscott helped evaluate officers as a member of the War Department Screening Board. Then in 1948–1949, he spent a year as the Chairman of the Army Advisory Board for Amphibious Operations, at Fort Monroe, Virginia. It was between meetings of this board that he began assembling the material for his two books.

== Central Intelligence Agency ==
In 1951, Walter Bedell Smith, Director of the Central Intelligence Agency (CIA), appointed Truscott as "Special Consultant to the United States Commissioner" in Frankfurt, Germany. However, this was simply a cover for his real assignment as senior CIA representative in Germany. Truscott had been placed in charge of cloak-and-dagger operations in a vital part of Europe. This only came to light after declassification of a secret memorandum in 1994.

In 1953, President Eisenhower approved CIA Director Allen Dulles' recommendation that Truscott be appointed the CIA's Deputy Director for Coordination. This appointment meant that Truscott was now controlling the agency's rapidly expanding network of agents worldwide. His responsibilities included facilitating the overthrow of governments in Iran and Guatemala. Truscott was involved in planning Operation PBSuccess, the CIA mission to overthrow Guatemalan President Jacobo Árbenz. According to Harry Jeffers' biography, Truscott was instrumental in convincing Eisenhower to support PBSuccess with air power. However, another biography by William Heefner suggests that specifics of Truscott's involvement cannot be substantiated.

Truscott left the CIA in 1958. He wrote nothing about his service in the CIA in Command Missions, and there is nothing about his CIA activities in his papers at the George C. Marshall Library.

== Death and legacy ==
Truscott died on 12 September 1965, in Alexandria, Virginia and was buried at Arlington National Cemetery, in Arlington, Virginia. On 29 April 1966, Truscott Hall, a bachelor officers' quarters at the United States Army War College, was named after him. On 17 August 1974, Sarah Truscott, his wife, died and was buried next to him at Arlington National Cemetery.

In 2012, Truscott was honored at his birthplace of Chatfield.

Novelist and journalist Lucian Truscott IV is his grandson.

His great-grandson, Lucian K. Truscott V, is an infantry officer in the United States Army.

== Personality ==
Truscott had a very gravelly voice, said to be the result of an accidental ingestion of acid in childhood. He was superstitious about his clothing, and usually wore a leather jacket, "pink" pants and lucky boots in combat. He also wore a white scarf as a trademark, first during the Sicilian campaign.

Truscott once said to his son, "Let me tell you something, and don't ever forget it. You play games to win, not lose. And you fight wars to win. That's spelled W-I-N! And every good player in a game and every good commander in a war…has to have some son of a bitch in him. If he doesn't, he isn't a good player or commander....It's as simple as that. No son of a bitch, no commander."

Truscott was respected by his subordinates. A medical officer in the Seventh Army related stories he had heard from the men who served under Truscott. Unlike some commanders, Truscott was not noted for self-aggrandisement, (Note: "... Truscott's absolute exclusion of his name from dispatches. Such-and-such battalion captured this, or a particular regiment stormed that, or Private Somebody heroically did the other. Any attempt to use Truscott's name or names of the Third Division headquarters officers in dispatches was chopped off with reproof.") nor did he suffer such from his superiors. (Note: "Bill Mauldin described Truscott as a man 'so tough he could chew up a ham like Patton without bothering to pick his teeth.'") Others noted he was humbled by the sacrifices those under him had made. Bill Mauldin described the time Truscott gave the address on Memorial Day, 31 May 1945, in the military cemetery at Nettuno, outside Anzio: "He turned his back on the assembled windbags and sparklers and talked to the crosses in the cemetery, quietly, apologizing, and then walked away without looking around." (Note: Phibbs gives the date as 1943 and the place as Salerno but this was before the landings at Salerno and the cemetery is located in Nettuno.)

== Key assignments ==
- 3rd Infantry Division – 7 March 1943 to 16 February 1944
- VI Corps – 28 February 1944 to 14 October 1944
- Fifteenth United States Army – 15 October 1944 to 3 December 1944
- Fifth United States Army – 16 December 1944 to 2 October 1945
- Third United States Army – October 1945 to April 1946

== In popular culture ==
Truscott was portrayed by actor John Doucette in the 1970 film Patton. In one scene, as commander of the 3rd Infantry Division during the Allied invasion of Sicily, Truscott is shown arguing vehemently with General Patton over the latter's orders pertaining to his division.

Truscott was portrayed by Willis Bouchey in The Young Invaders and Charles H. Gray in Ike: The War Years.

== Decorations and medals ==
Truscott received the United States Army's second-highest decoration, the Distinguished Service Cross, for valor in action in Sicily on 11 July 1943, the second day of the invasion. Truscott's other decorations include the Army Distinguished Service Medal with two Oak Leaf Clusters, the Navy Distinguished Service Medal, the Legion of Merit and the Purple Heart.

== Dates of rank ==
Source – U.S. Army Register, 1948; pg. 2471.

No pin insignia in 1917	Second lieutenant, Officers Reserve Corps: 15 August 1917
No pin insignia in 1917	Second lieutenant, Regular Army: 26 October 1917
	First lieutenant, Temporary: 26 October 1917
	First lieutenant, Regular Army: 10 December 1918
	Captain, Regular Army: 1 July 1920
	Major, Regular Army: 1 August 1935
	Lieutenant Colonel, Regular Army: 18 August 1940
	Colonel, Army of the United States: 24 December 1941
	Brigadier General, Army of the United States: 24 May 1942
	Major General, Army of the United States: 24 November 1942
	Lieutenant General, Army of the United States: 2 September 1944
	Brigadier General, Regular Army: 28 February 1946
	Lieutenant General, Retired List: 30 September 1947
	General, Retired List: 19 July 1954

== Notes ==
Footnotes

== Bibliography ==
- Ferguson, Harvey (2015). The Last Cavalryman: The Life of General Lucian K. Truscott Jr. University of Oklahoma Press. ISBN 978-0-8061-4664-5.
- Heefner, Wilson A. (2010). Dogface Soldier: The Life of General Lucian K. Truscott, Jr. University of Missouri Press. ISBN 978-0-8262-7212-6.
- Jeffers, Harry Paul (2008). Command of Honor: General Lucian Truscott's Path to Victory in World War II. Penguin. ISBN 9781440630668.
- Phibbs, Brendan (1987). The Other Side of Time: A Combat Surgeon in World War II. Little, Brown and Company. ISBN 0-316-70510-1.

Military offices
Preceded by Jonathan W. Anderson	Commanding General 3rd Infantry Division; 1943–1944	Succeeded by John W. O'Daniel
Preceded by John P. Lucas	Commanding General VI Corps; February–October 1944	Succeeded by Edward H. Brooks
Preceded by Newly activated organization	Commanding General Fifteenth Army; October–December 1944	Succeeded by Ray E. Porter
Preceded by Mark W. Clark	Commanding General Fifth Army; 1944–1945	Post deactivated
Preceded by George S. Patton	Commanding General Third Army; 1945–1946	Succeeded by Geoffrey Keyes
