= William Orlando Darby =

United States Army general (1911–1945)

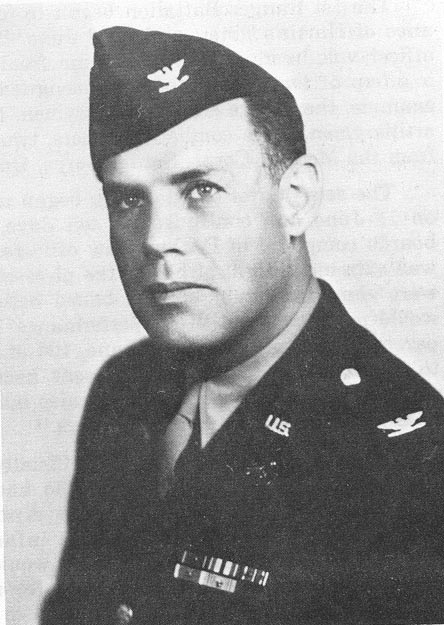
- Born: February 8, 1911; Fort Smith, Arkansas, United States
- Died: April 30, 1945 (aged 34); Torbole, Italy
- Burial place: Fort Smith National Cemetery, Arkansas, United States
- Military career
- Allegiance: United States
- Branch: United States Army
- Service years: 1933–1945
- Rank: Brigadier General
- Service number: 0-19133
- Commands: 179th Infantry Regiment; 6615th Ranger Force; 1st Ranger Battalion
- Conflicts: World War II †
- Awards: Distinguished Service Cross (2); Army Distinguished Service Medal; Silver Star; Legion of Merit; Bronze Star Medal; Purple Heart (3); Croix de Guerre (France); Order of Kutuzov Third Class (USSR); Distinguished Service Order (United Kingdom)

William Orlando Darby (February 8, 1911 – April 30, 1945) was a career United States Army officer who fought in World War II, where he was killed in action at age 34 in Italy. He was posthumously promoted to brigadier general. Darby was the founding commander of the First Ranger Battalion, which evolved into the United States Army Rangers. He was subsequently portrayed by James Garner in the 1958 theatrical film about Darby's career titled Darby's Rangers, which was also the title of his memoir, the source for many of his exploits.

== Early military career ==
Darby's first assignment was as assistant executive and supply officer with the 82nd Field Artillery at Fort Bliss, Texas. In July 1934, he transferred to Cloudcroft, New Mexico, where he commanded the 1st Cavalry Division detachment. He received intensive artillery training from September 1937 to June 1938 while attending Field Artillery School at Fort Sill, Oklahoma.

On September 9, 1940, Darby was promoted to captain and subsequently served with the 80th Division at Camp Jackson, South Carolina; Fort Benning, Georgia; Camp Beauregard, Louisiana; and Fort Des Moines, Iowa.

== World War II ==
=== Army Rangers ===
As World War II progressed, Darby saw rapid promotion to the grade of lieutenant colonel. He was with the first United States combat troops sent to Europe after the United States entry into World War II, the 34th Infantry Division, a National Guard unit known as the Red Bull. During its stay in Northern Ireland Darby became interested in the British Commandos. On June 19, 1942, the 1st Ranger Battalion was sanctioned, and Darby was put in charge of their recruitment and training under the Commandos in Achnacarry, Scotland. Many of these original Rangers were volunteers from the 34th. In November 1942, the 1st Ranger Battalion made its first assault at Arzew, Algeria.

Darby was awarded the Silver Star for his actions in Tunisia on February 12, 1943:

Without regard for his personal safety, the day previous to a raid, he reconnoitred enemy positions and planned the attack which he led the following morning. The thorough organization and successful attack led by Lt. Col. Darby revealed his initiative, courage, and devotion to duty which is a credit to the Armed Forces of the United States.

Darby was subsequently awarded the Distinguished Service Cross for his actions on March 21–25. The citation stated:

Lt. Col. Darby struck with his force with complete surprise at dawn in the rear of a strongly fortified enemy position. Always conspicuously at the head of his troops, he personally led assaults against the enemy line in the face of heavy machine gun and artillery fire, establishing the fury of the Ranger attack by his skilful employment of hand grenades in close quarter fighting. On March 22, Lt. Col. Darby directed his battalion in advance on Bon Hamean, capturing prisoners and destroying a battery of self propelled artillery.

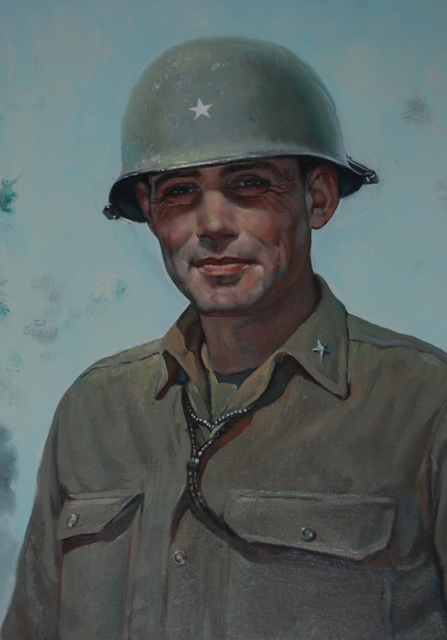
William Orlando Darby

"Darby's Rangers" saw further action during the Allied invasion of Sicily kicking off the Italian Campaign. Darby received an oak leaf cluster to his Distinguished Service Cross for extraordinary heroism in July 1943 in Sicily:

Lt. Col. Darby, with the use of one 37mm gun, which he personally manned, managed not only to repulse an enemy attack but succeeded with this weapon in destroying one tank, while two others were accounted for by well-directed hand grenade fire.

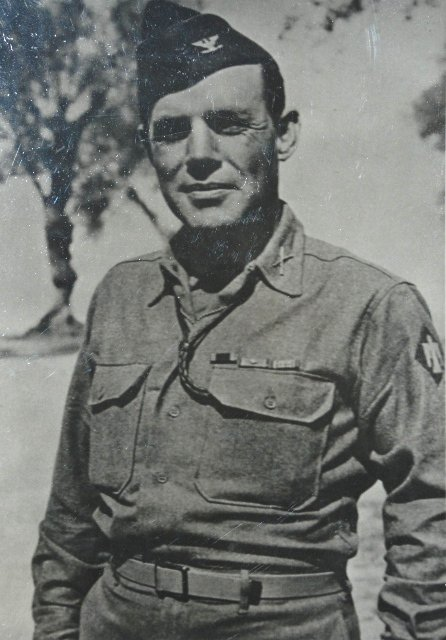
Darby in 1944 as a full colonel

Darby took part in the Allied invasion of the Italian mainland in September 1943, and was promoted to full colonel on December 11. Donald Downes of the OSS, who met with him to provide intelligence support for the invasion, described him:

This spit-and-polish dandy with three battalions of men who looked like hobos in mismatched uniforms was more beloved by his men than any leader, military or otherwise, whom I have ever known. He was alternately as kind as an indulgent mother, and as a tough as a Prussian drillmaster. I have seen him cry when a soldier went in for an amputation, and cry publicly and unashamed. I have heard him tongue-lash a soldier in a really brutal manner for a small forgetfulness.

The three existing Ranger battalions were effectively wiped out - killed or captured - in the disastrous Battle of Cisterna during the Anzio campaign in early February 1944, after which they were disbanded.

=== 179th Infantry command ===
Darby was then put in command of the 179th Infantry Regiment, still fighting the battle of Anzio. He served with it from February 18 to April 2, 1944, before being called back to the US ahead of the Allied breakthrough in the Italian Campaign.

=== Reassignment stateside ===
Darby was ordered to Washington, D.C. for duty with the Army Ground Forces and later with the War Department General Staff at The Pentagon.

=== Return to Europe ===
In March 1945, Darby returned to Italy for an observation tour with five-star General of the Army Henry H. Arnold. On April 23, 1945, Brigadier General Robinson E. Duff, Assistant Division Commander of the 10th Mountain Division, was wounded; Darby took over for Duff. "Task Force Darby" spearheaded the breakout of the Fifth United States Army from the Po River valley bridgehead during the Spring 1945 offensive in Italy and reached Torbole at the head of Lake Garda.

== Death ==
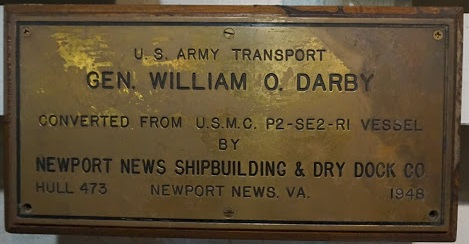
Builder plate from the US Army transport General William O. Darby

On April 30, 1945, while Darby was issuing orders for the attack on Trento to cut off a German retreat, an artillery shell burst in the middle of the assembled officers and NCOs, killing Darby and a regimental Sergeant Major, John "Tim" Evans, and wounding several others. "Task Force Darby" continued with their mission. Two days later, on May 2, 1945, all German forces in Italy surrendered.

Darby, aged 34 at the time of his death, was posthumously promoted to brigadier general on May 15, 1945. He was buried in Cisterna, Italy. He was reinterred at Fort Smith National Cemetery in Fort Smith, Arkansas on March 11, 1949.

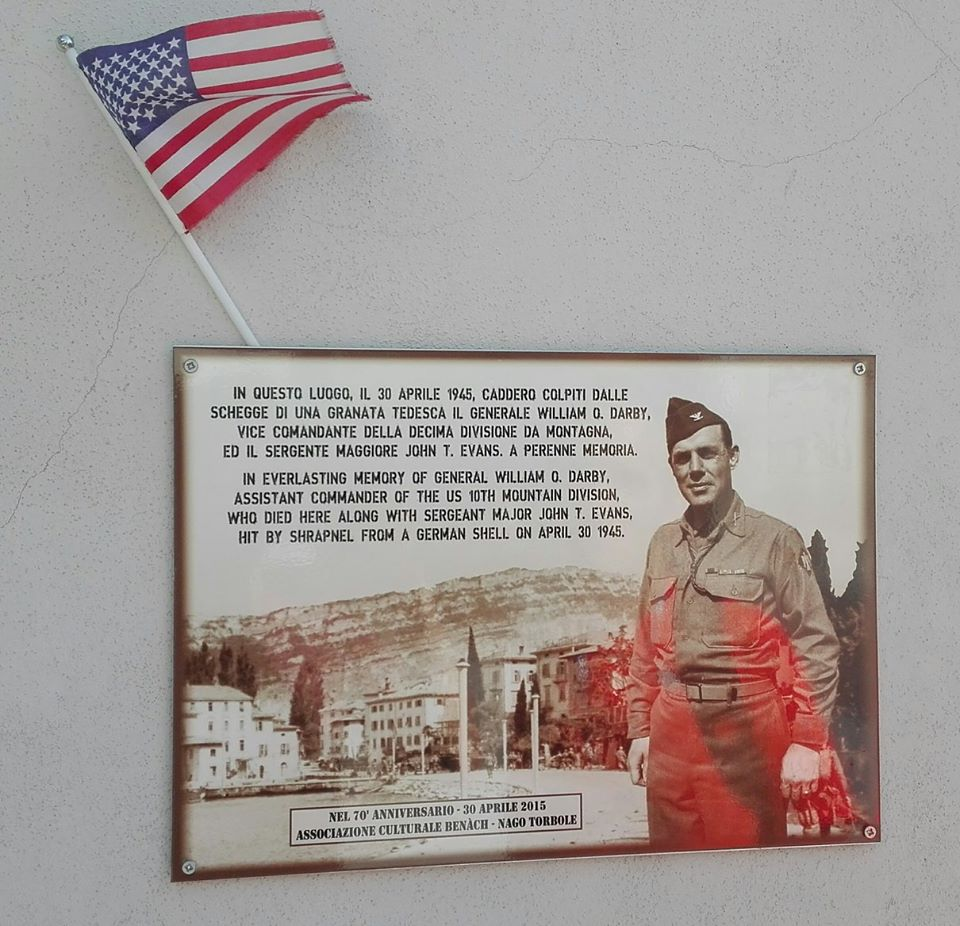
Plaque to Col. Darby and SGM Evans, Torbole, Italy

== Legacy ==
- Darby's medals, military records, and uniforms are on display at the Fort Smith Museum of History in Fort Smith, and his boyhood home is open for tours.
- Camp Darby, near Fort Benning, which is home to the first phase of Ranger School, is named after him.
- Two U.S. Army installations in Europe were named after Darby; W.O. Darby Kaserne, Fürth, Germany (closed in 1995); and the operational Camp Darby, near Livorno, Italy.
- The town of Cisterna, Italy, dedicated its high school to Darby.
- A book entitled Onward We Charge: The Heroic Story of Darby's Rangers in World War II by H. Paul Jeffers was published in 2007.
- An Admiral Benson Class transport ship, the USS Admiral W. S. Sims (AP-127), was renamed USAT General William O. Darby in the 1940s.
- In 1955, the name of Fort Smith Junior High School was changed to William O. Darby Junior High School. In 1958, the name of the school's athletic teams was changed from Cubs to Rangers after the famous Darby's Rangers.
- In 1958, the motion picture Darby's Rangers, starring James Garner as Darby, dramatized Darby's military exploits. Wayde Preston also played a character role based on Darby in the 1968 film Anzio.
- In 1992, Darby was inducted into the Ranger Hall of Fame.
- Every year in Italy on April 30 the "40-mile Ranger Challenge Hike" to honor Col. Darby is held from Peschiera del Garda to the Darby monument in Torbole sul Garda.

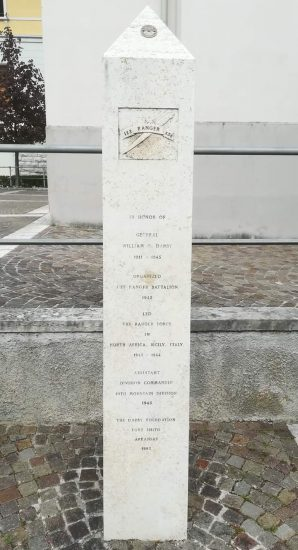
Monument to the memory of General W.O. Darby in Torbole sul Garda, Italy

== Awards and decorations ==
Darby's military awards include:

Badges:

Combat Infantryman Badge

Awards:

Distinguished Service Cross with one bronze oak leaf cluster
Army Distinguished Service Medal
Silver Star
Legion of Merit
Bronze Star Medal
Purple Heart with two oak leaf clusters
American Defense Service Medal
American Campaign Medal
European-African-Middle Eastern Campaign Medal with five campaign stars
World War II Victory Medal
Croix de Guerre with Silver Star (France)
Order of Kutuzov Third Class (Soviet Union)
Distinguished Service Order (United Kingdom)

== Dates of rank ==
Insignia	Rank	Component	Date
No insignia	Cadet	United States Military Academy	July 1, 1929
	Second lieutenant	Regular Army	June 13, 1933
	First lieutenant	Regular Army	June 13, 1936
	Captain	Army of the United States	September 9 (accepted October 2) 1940
	Major	Army of the United States	June 1, 1942
	Lieutenant colonel	Army of the United States	August 6, 1942
	Captain	Regular Army	June 13, 1943
	Colonel	Army of the United States	December 11, 1943
	Brigadier general	Army of the United States	May 15, 1945 (posthumous)
