= 3rd Ranger Battalion =

3rd Battalion, 75th Ranger Regiment
- 3rd Ranger Battalion shoulder sleeve insignia
- Active: 1943–45, 1954–56, 1969–71, 1984–present
- Country: United States
- Branch: United States Army
- Type: Specialized Light infantry
- Role: Special operations
- Size: Battalion
- Part of: 75th Ranger Regiment
- Garrison/HQ: Fort Benning, Georgia
- Engagements: World War II: Italian campaign; Vietnam; Panama; Operation Gothic Serpent: Mogadishu; War on terror: War in Afghanistan; Iraq War; Operation Inherent Resolve

Insignia
- Distinctive unit insignia

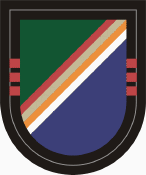
- Unit beret flash

- NATO Map Symbol (1998)

- NATO Map Symbol (2017)

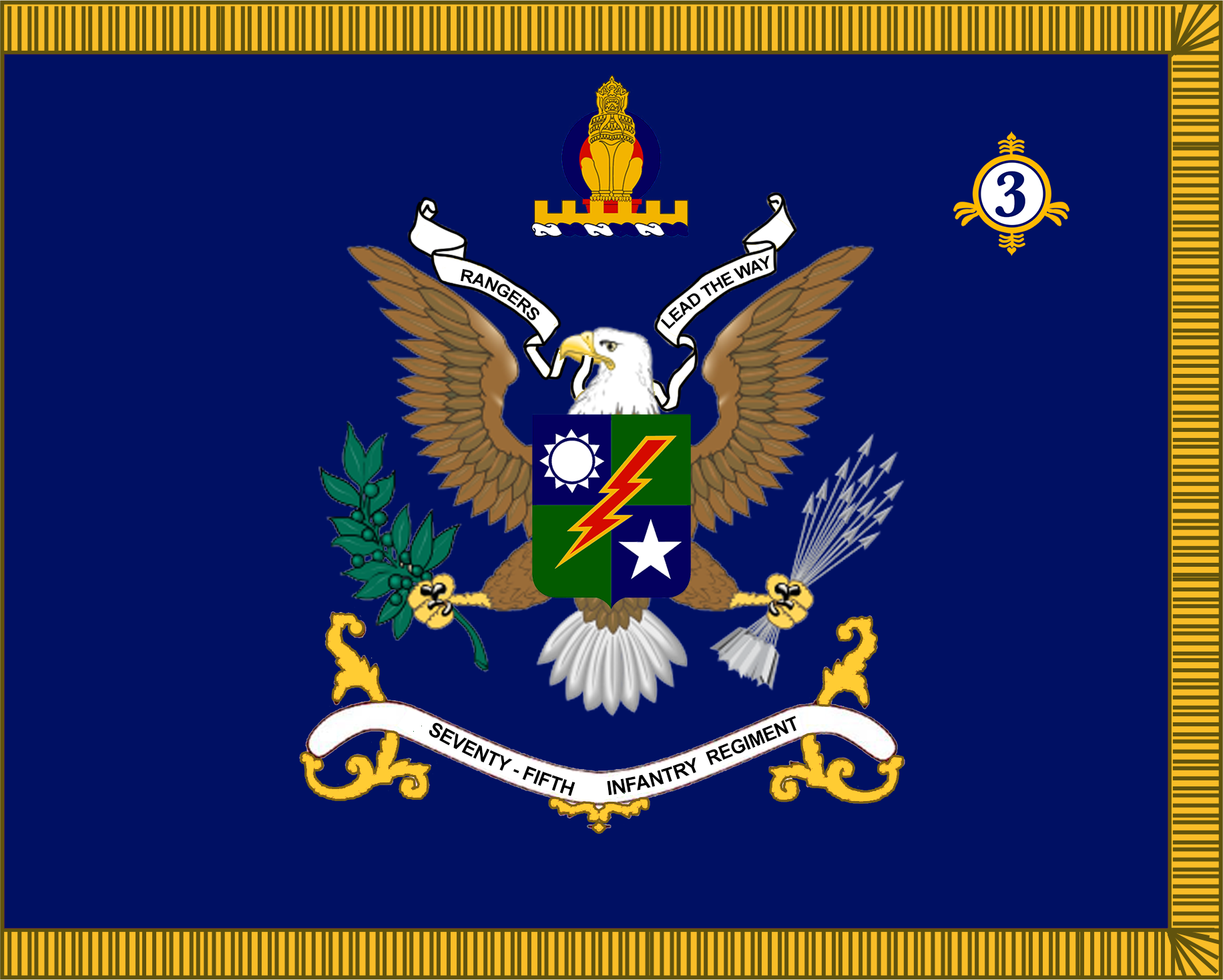
- 75th Ranger Regiment 3rd Battalion Flag

The 3rd Ranger Battalion is the third of three Ranger Battalions belonging to the United States Army's 75th Ranger Regiment. It is currently based at Fort Benning, Georgia.

== History ==
=== World War II ===
==== Italy ====
After the impressive performance of the 1st Ranger Battalion in the North Africa Campaign the 3rd Ranger Battalion was organized on 19 June 1943 in Morocco. The battalion was made up of American volunteers and led by Major Herman Dammer.

The battalion participated in the invasion of Sicily and the invasion of Italy; it was essentially destroyed at the Battle of Cisterna in early 1944 and subsequently deactivated.

==== Merrill’s Marauders ====
The other World War II unit that 3rd Ranger Battalion draws lineage from is the 5307 Provisional Unit, also called Merrill's Marauders. This unit was consolidated 10 August 1944 with Company F, 475th Infantry Regiment (Long Range Penetration, Special) (constituted 25 May 1944 in the Army of the United States), and consolidated unit designated as Company F, 475th Infantry Regiment. This unit was deactivated 1 July 1945 in China.

=== Post-WWII ===
==== Korea ====
The 2nd Ranger Battalion was reactivated during the Korean War and formed the 3rd Ranger Infantry Company. They fought with distinction before being deactivated. While deactivated, they were redesignated as Company A, 3d Ranger Infantry Battalion and later consolidated with 1st Company, 1st Battalion, 2d Regiment, 1st Special Service Force redesignated as Headquarters and Headquarters Company, 13th Special Forces Group, 1st Special Forces before eventually being deactivated again.

==== Inactivation ====
Company F, 475th Infantry was redesignated 21 June 1954 as Company F, 75th Infantry Regiment (Ranger), in the Army of the United States, and was allotted on 26 October 1954 to the Regular Army. It was activated 20 November 1954 on Okinawa, and was inactivated there on 21 March 1956.

==== Vietnam War ====
Company F, 75th Infantry Regiment (Ranger) was again activated on 1 February 1969 in Vietnam and was one of the Vietnam War era Ranger companies before it was again inactivated on 15 March 1971 in Vietnam.

==== Reformation ====
Company F, 75th Infantry Regiment (Ranger) was redesignated on 3 October 1984 as Headquarters and Headquarters Company, 3rd Battalion, 75th Infantry, and activated at Fort Benning, Georgia (organic elements concurrently constituted and activated).

==== Further reformation ====
Headquarters and Headquarters Company consolidated 3 February 1986 with what the deactivated former Company A, 3rd Ranger Infantry Battalion, thus uniting with its World War II era 3rd Ranger Battalion heritage. The unit was then redesignated from 3rd Battalion, 75th Infantry Regiment to 3rd Battalion, 75th Ranger Regiment.

==== Reformation as the 75th Ranger Regiment ====
On 20 December 1989, the 75th Ranger Regiment was committed to Operation Just Cause, in Panama. Along with the 2nd Ranger Battalion, Companies A and B of the 3rd Battalion conducted an airfield seizure of the Rio Hato Airfield, and Company C participated along with the 1st Ranger Battalion to seize the airfield at Torrijos/Tocumen Airport, and subsequent combat operations contributed significantly to the United States victory in Panama.

==== Deployment to Somalia ====
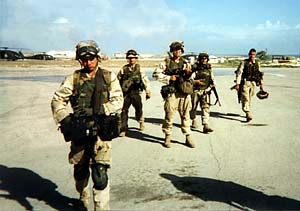
Rangers from Task Force Ranger return to their base.

In August 1993, elements of Company B of the 3rd Ranger Battalion and the battalion headquarters deployed to Somalia as part of Operation Gothic Serpent . codenamed Task Force Ranger, part of the UN intervention in the Somali Civil War. On 3 October 1993, they performed a daring daylight assault which became a protracted gunfight with hundreds of Somali militia. By the end of the battle, two Black Hawk helicopters had crashed within the city and the force was extracted under heavy fire with assistance from units of the American QRF, Malaysian Army, and Pakistani Army. American forces suffered 19 KIA, 5 MIA (later confirmed KIA and included in the 19 KIA listed), and one 160th SOAR pilot captured as a POW (who was released several weeks later). Though the force achieved its objectives in capturing high value targets and inflicted enormous casualties on the enemy (estimates ranged from 500 to 1,000+ military and civilians killed and thousands injured), the political backlash was too great and caused their withdrawal from Somalia.

=== War on terror ===
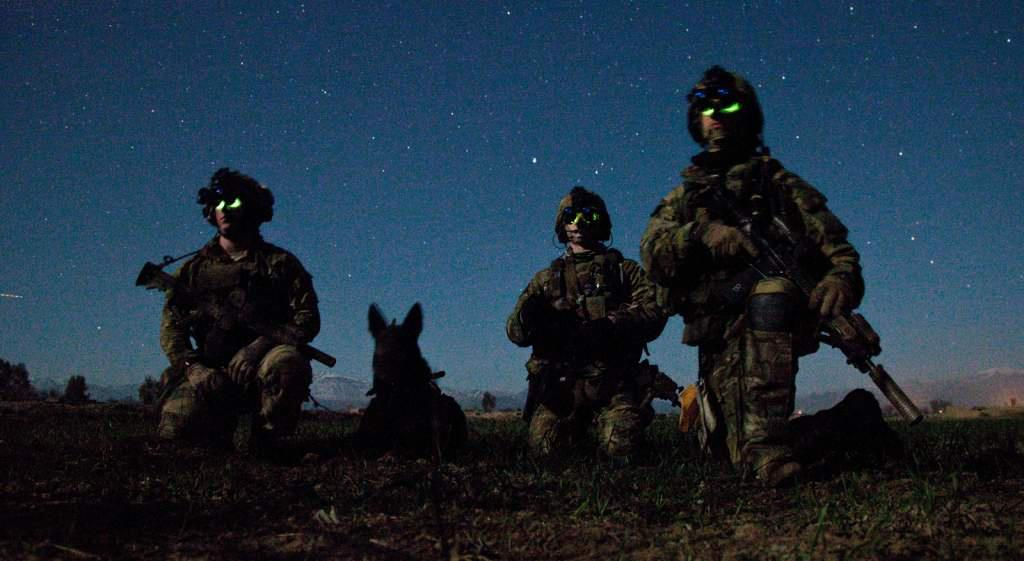
Rangers from 3rd Ranger Battalion with their dog during a nighttime combat mission in Afghanistan, 6 March 2012.

==== Spearhead and raid in Objective Rhino ====
After the terrorist attacks of 11 September 2001, the 3rd Ranger Battalion deployed to Afghanistan in support of Operation Enduring Freedom. On 19 October 2001, during the 2001 invasion of Afghanistan, 200 Rangers of 3rd Battalion, 75th Ranger Regiment spearheaded ground forces by conducting an airborne assault to seize Objective Rhino. The Rangers parachuted onto the airstrip from 4 Air Force Special Operations MC-130 Combat Talon Aircraft from 800 feet above ground level. Before the Rangers landed, American bombers and AC-130 Gunships bombarded the airstrip reportedly killing 11 Taliban fighters and 9 Taliban fighters escaped. After the Rangers landed, a single remaining Taliban guard appeared but was shot and killed by several Rangers. The Rangers established blocking positions. Other Rangers cleared a compound opening locked steel doors with shotguns or explosive charges. Two Rangers who were injured in the jump were evacuated by a U.S. Combat Talon. American Air Force Special Tactics Squadron airmen surveyed the DLS to determine its capability to handle larger aircraft. Orbiting AC-130 Spectre gunships bombarded and destroyed a small convoy of enemy vehicles and troops approaching the area. American attack helicopters landed, refueled, rearmed, and flew off to conduct more operations against the Taliban. After staying at the airstrip for 5 hours and 24 minutes, all of the U.S. Rangers and American Combat control teams boarded the MC-130s and departed. The entire American raiding force withdrew from the airstrip after completing their objective.

==== Objective Honda ====
Spc. Jonn J. Edmunds and Pfc. Kristofer T. Stonesifer were the first combat casualties in the war on terror when their MH-60L helicopter crashed at Objective Honda in Pakistan, a temporary staging site used by a company of Rangers from 3rd Battalion.

==== Raid at desert landing strip (DLS) Bastogne ====
At November 13, 2001. One American MC-130 Combat Talon dropped 32 U.S. Army Rangers and an 8-man American Air Force Special Tactics Squadron element led by American captain David Watson onto DLS Bastogne southwest of Kandahar. The combat parachute jump was at 800 feet. After the Rangers landed, they punched in the coordinates of the assembly area. The U.S. Air-force STS team verified that the strip was suitable for C-130 four-engine turboprop before placing the infrared landing lights down its length. Two American MC-130s landed unloading 4 American AH-6 Attack Helicopters. The 4 American attack helicopters conducted hit-and-run raids on the Taliban. The 4 helicopters flew to Objective Wolverine. The American pilots guided their attack helicopters by their night-vision goggles. At Objective Wolverine, there was a Taliban base of stored equipment, vehicles, and some radar pieces. The 4 American attack helicopters made several runs destroying the Taliban compound with rockets. With the Taliban base compound destroyed, the 4 attack helicopters flew back to the airstrip DLS Bastogne. At the strip, the 4 U.S. attack helicopters rearmed and refueled. The 4 helicopters flew off again this time to Objective Raptor which was a Taliban compound containing vehicles and equipment. The attack helicopters made several attack runs destroying the Taliban compound base. Then the 4 attack helicopters returned to DLS Bastogne and were loaded back into the MC-130 transport aircraft. The entire American raiding force including all aircraft, U.S. Army Rangers, and American Air Force STS operatives departed into the air and withdrew safely.

==== First raid at (DLS) Bulge ====
On the nights of November 16–17, 2001. Six desert mobility vehicles were inserted into the Afghan desert driven by 48 U.S. Army Rangers and U.S. Air Force STS personnel led by an American captain Chuck Seims(pseudonym). The American force of Rangers and Air-force STS operatives in their desert vehicles patrolled their way to their objective DLS Bulge which was an airstrip. The Air Force operatives gathered core samples and observed the runway if it was suitable for aircraft landing. While this was going on, the Rangers set up a hidden security perimeter overlooking DLS Bulge with camouflage nets. The Rangers brushed away tire tracks and made radio contacts. Finally on November 18, 2001. The U.S. Ranger task force moved to the airstrip in their vehicles and set a perimeter. The Ranger task force set out infrared landing lights along the length of the runway allowing the MC-130 transports to land and unload 4 American AH-6 gunships. The 4 U.S. attack helicopters took off and bombarded Taliban targets. The 4 helicopters returned, landed, rearmed, refueled, and flew off again conducting more aerial attacks on the Taliban. The U.S. attack helicopters returned, landed on the airstrip, and were loaded on the MC-130 transports. The MC-130 transports with the attack helicopters loaded in the cargo section departed into the air. The Rangers helped the Air Force STS operatives retrieve the landing lights, swept the area of any evidence they were there, and all together boarded their desert vehicles. The Rangers and Air Force operatives withdrew from the air strip in their desert vehicles. The Ranger task force set up a hidden hide site perimeter at a secure location.

==== Second raid at (DLS) Bulge ====
The same task force of Rangers and Air Force STS personnel who raided (DLS) Bulge were prepared to conduct another raid at the same airstrip. The Rangers set up another observation post. Later, the Rangers and Air-force STS personnel boarded into their desert vehicles and drove to the (DLS) Bulge airstrip. The Rangers set up a perimeter and the Air Force STS laid out landing lights which helped MC-130s land. The MC-130s unloaded AH-6 attack helicopters. The U.S. attack helicopters conducted a hit-and-run raid bombarding Taliban targets before returning to refuel and rearm. Then the attack helicopters flew off again and conducted another hit-and-run raid conducting more aerial attacks on the Taliban. Then the attack helicopters returned and were loaded onto the MC-130s. All the Rangers, Air Force STS personnel, desert vehicles, and equipment were loaded onto the MC-130s. The entire American raiding force on board the MC-130 transports departed into the air and safely withdrew after completing their objectives.

==== Attempted Deployment at Tora Bora ====
During the Battle of Tora Bora in December 2001, a CIA Jawbreaker team (small group of CIA SAD ground branch operators) requested that the 3rd Battalion, 75th Ranger Regiment be inserted into the mountains to establish blocking positions along potential escape routes out of Tora Bora into Pakistan. They would serve as the 'anvil' while Green Berets with the AMF (Afghan Militia Forces) would be the 'Hammer,'. With attached Air Force Combat Controllers, the Rangers could direct airstrikes onto enemy concentrations or engage them in ambushes, but the Jawbreaker team's request was denied.

==== Capturing an air base and a dam in the Iraq War ====
In 2003, the 3rd Battalion was called upon to participate in the 2003 invasion of Iraq. On 24 March 2003, 3rd Battalion 75th Ranger Regiment conducted a combat drop onto H-1 Air Base, securing the site as a staging area for operations in western Iraq. On the night of 31 March/April 1, 2003, Delta Force and 3/75th captured the Haditha Dam complex and held it for a further 5 days.

==== Further Operations in Iraq and Afghanistan ====
At the end of 2003, the battalion deployed again, this time sending elements of the battalion to both Afghanistan and Iraq. The battalion deployed multiple times in support of Operation Iraqi Freedom until summer 2010. The battalion continues to deploy in support of Operation Enduring Freedom. Primary tasks include: direct action, national and international emergency crisis response, airfield seizure, airborne and air assault operations, special reconnaissance, intelligence and counter intelligence, combat search and rescue, personnel recovery and hostage rescue, joint special operations, and counter terrorism.

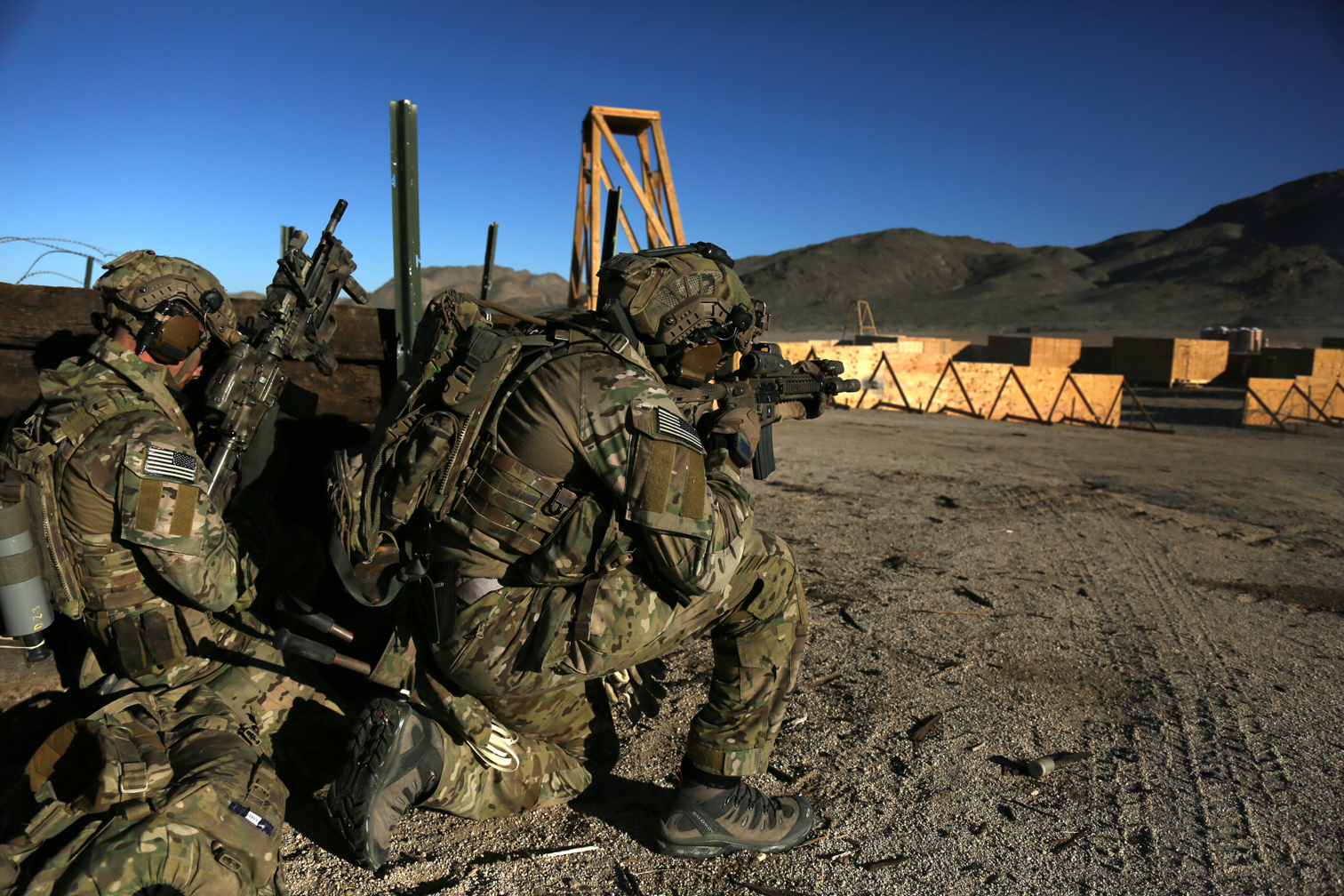
Rangers from Delta Company, 3rd Battalion assault a town during a live-fire exercise at Fort Irwin, CA, Feb. 24, 2015.

==== Raid on a terrorist safe house in Iraq ====
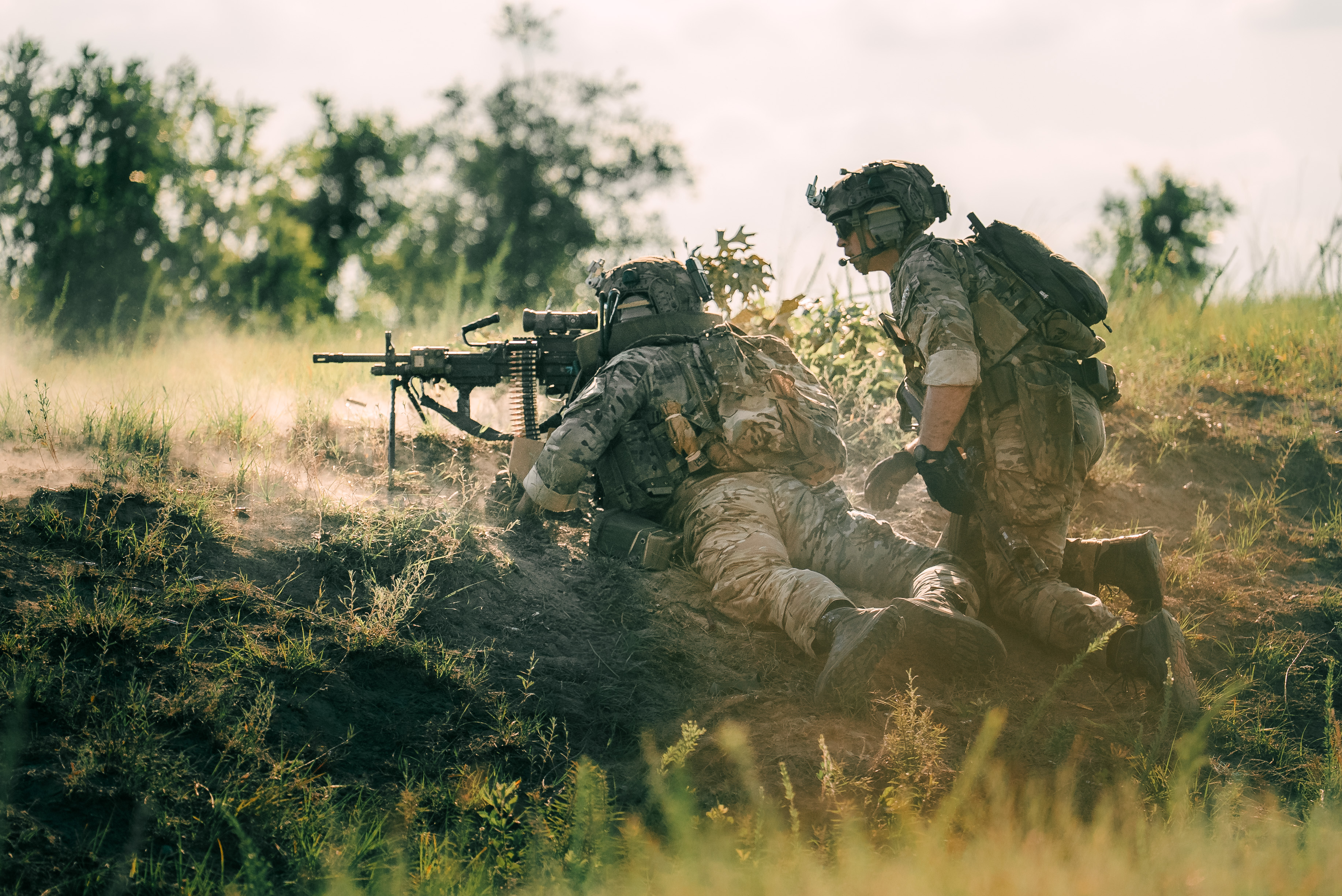
3rd Battalion doing a live-fire training exercise at Fort Benning, Georgia.

On 18 April 2010, ISOF troops, supported by US troops, carried out a night-time raid on a terrorist safe house near Tikrit in Iraq. The ISOF killed Abu Ayyub al-Masri and Abu Omar al-Baghdadi, the two leaders of ISI; 16 others were also arrested. A US UH-60 Blackhawk helicopter supporting the mission was shot down, killing a Ranger NCO from 3/75th and wounding the aircrew.

==== Ranger casualties in the war on terror ====
By mid-2015 each Ranger battalion had completed its 20th deployment in support of both Afghanistan and Iraq operations. Between 2001 and 2021 in Iraq and Afghanistan, 27 Rangers from the battalion have been killed.

==== Ranger and Afghan Commando joint raid against ISIS ====
On 26 April 2017, 50 Rangers from 3/75th joined 40 Afghan commandos to conduct a joint US-Afghan raid in Mohmand Valley targeting the headquarters of Abdul Hasib, the Emir of ISIS-K, in a village in Achin District, Nangarhar Province, Afghanistan. The force was flown into Mohmand Valley and within minutes was engaged in a heavy, close-quarter firefight. AC-130 gunships, Apache helicopters, F-16 fighters, and drones were called in to support the fierce firefight with ISIS-K militants. The firefight lasted three hours, resulting in two Rangers from C and D Companies dead (possibly caused by friendly fire) after being medevaced and a third wounded. Thirty-five ISIS-K militants (including Abdul Hasib and an unspecified number of ISIS-K leaders) were also killed.

== Lineage ==
The 3rd Battalion of the 75th Ranger Regiment traces its lineage to two units; Company H, 475th Infantry Regiment (previously known as the 5307th Composite Unit (Provisional), or "Merrill's Marauders") and Company A, 3rd Ranger Battalion. The units originally had separate lineages, but were then consolidated in 1986.

- Constituted 3 October 1943 in the Army of the United States in the China-Burma-India Theater of Operations as an element of the 5307th Composite Unit (Provisional)
- Consolidated 10 August 1944 with Company F, 475th Infantry (constituted 25 May 1944 in the Army of the United States), and consolidated unit designated as Company F, 475th Infantry
- Inactivated 1 July 1945 in China
- Redesignated 21 June 1954 as Company F, 75th Infantry
- Allotted 26 October 1954 to the Regular Army
- Activated 20 November 1954 on Okinawa
- Inactivated 21 March 1956 on Okinawa
- Activated 1 February 1969 in Vietnam
- Inactivated 15 March 1971 in Vietnam
- Redesignated 2 October 1984 as Headquarters and Headquarters Company, 3d Battalion, 75th Infantry, and activated at Fort Benning, Georgia (organic elements concurrently constituted and activated)
- Headquarters and Headquarters Company consolidated 3 February 1986 with former Company A, 3d Ranger Infantry Battalion (see ANNEX); 3d Battalion, 75th Infantry, concurrently redesignated as the 3d Battalion, 75th Ranger Regiment

=== Annex ===
- Constituted 21 July 1943 in the Army of the United States as Company A, 3rd Ranger Battalion; concurrently consolidated with Company A, 3rd Ranger Battalion (Provisional) (organized 21 May 1943 in North Africa), and consolidated unit designated as Company A, 3rd Ranger Battalion.
- Redesignated 1 August 1943 as Company A, 3rd Ranger Infantry Battalion.
- Disbanded 15 August 1944.
- Reconstituted 25 October 1950 in the Regular Army as the 3rd Ranger Infantry Company.
- Activated 28 October at Fort Benning, Georgia.
- Inactivated 1 August 1951 in Korea.
- Redesignated 24 November 1952 as Company A, 3rd Ranger Infantry Battalion.
- Consolidated 15 April 1960 with the 1st Company, 1st Battalion, 2nd Regiment, 1st Special Service Force (activated 9 July 1942), and consolidated unit redesignated as Headquarters and Headquarters Company, 13th Special Forces Group, 1st Special Forces.
- Withdrawn 14 December 1960 from the Regular Army and allotted to the United States Army Reserve (organic elements concurrently constituted).
- Group activated 1 March 1961 with headquarters at Jacksonville, Florida.
- Headquarters and Headquarters Company inactivated 15 April 1963 at Jacksonville, Florida (organic elements inactivated 21 January 1966).
- Former Company A, 3rd Ranger Infantry Battalion, withdrawn 3 February 1986, consolidated with Headquarters and Headquarters Company, 3rd Battalion, 75th Infantry, and consolidated unit redesignated as Headquarters and Headquarters Company, 3rd Battalion, 75th Ranger Regiment (remainder of 13th Special Forces Group, 1st Special Forces – hereafter separate lineage).

== Honors ==
=== Campaign participation credit ===
- World War II:
1. Algeria-French Morocco (with arrowhead)
2. Tunisia
3. Sicily (with arrowhead)
4. Naples-Foggia (with arrowhead)
5. Anzio (with arrowhead)
6. Rome-Arno
7. Normandy (with arrowhead)
8. Northern France
9. Rhineland
10. Ardennes-Alsace
11. Central Europe
12. New Guinea
13. Leyte (with arrowhead)
14. Luzon
15. India-Burma
16. Central Burma
- Korean War:
1. First UN Counteroffensive;
2. CCF Spring Offensive;
3. UN Summer-Fall Offensive
- Vietnam:
1. Counteroffensive, Phase VI;
2. Tet 69/Counteroffensive;
3. Summer-Fall 1969;
4. Winter-Spring 1970;
5. Sanctuary Counteroffensive;
6. Counteroffensive, Phase VII
- Armed Forces Expeditions:
1. Panama (with arrowhead)
2. Somalia (with arrowhead)
3. Afghanistan (with arrowhead)
4. Iraq (with arrowhead)

=== Decorations ===
- Presidential Unit Citation (Army) for EL GUETTAR
- Presidential Unit Citation (Army) for SALERNO
- Presidential Unit Citation (Army) for POINTE DU HOC
- Presidential Unit Citation (Army) for SAAR RIVER AREA
- Presidential Unit Citation (Army) for MYITKYINA
- Valorous Unit Award for BINH DUONG PROVINCE
- Valorous Unit Award for MOGADISHU
- Republic of Korea Presidential Unit Citation for UIJONGBU CORRIDOR
- Republic of Korea Presidential Unit Citation for KOREA 1951
- Republic of Vietnam Cross of Gallantry with Palm for VIETNAM 1969
- Republic of Vietnam Cross of Gallantry with Palm for VIETNAM 1969–1970
- Republic of Vietnam Civil Action Honor Medal, First Class for VIETNAM 1969–1970

== Notable 3rd Battalion alumni ==
- General Stanley A. McChrystal, former commander of the 75th Ranger Regiment, International Security Assistance Force (ISAF) and Joint Special Operations Command. Served as the 3rd Ranger battalion liaison officer in September 1985, commander of A Company in January 1986, served again as battalion liaison officer in May 1987, and battalion operations officer (S-3) in 1988.
- Colonel Danny McKnight, 3rd Ranger Battalion commander during the Battle of Mogadishu.
- Colonel Michael D. Steele, B Company Commander, 3rd Ranger Battalion during the Battle of Mogadishu. Steele Led his company as part of Task Force Ranger.
- Major Jeff Struecker, served as a staff sergeant and squad leader assigned to Task Force Ranger as a part of B Company, 3rd Ranger Battalion, 75th Ranger Regiment. Struecker and his partner, SPC Isaac Gmazel Won the Best Ranger Competition in 1996. He became commissioned as a chaplain in 2000 until his retirement in 2011.
- General Joseph Votel, former commander of the 75th Ranger Regiment, United States Special Operations Command and Joint Special Operations Command. Votel led 200 Rangers from 3rd Battalion, who parachuted towards an airfield south of Kandahar, and attacked several Taliban targets.
- Sergeant Nicholas Irving, author and former sniper in the 3rd Battalion.
- Sergeant Joe Duarte, MMA world champion and investor who served in the 3rd Battalion.
- Staff Sergeant Keni Thomas, country music singer who served in the 3rd Battalion as part of Task Force Ranger.
- General Paul LaCamera, commanded a number of units including the 3rd Ranger Battalion, the 75th Ranger Regiment, XVIII Airborne Corps, and Combined Joint Task Force – Operation Inherent Resolve.

.

== See also ==
- United States Army Rangers
- 75th Ranger Regiment
- 1st Ranger Battalion
- 2nd Ranger Battalion

== Works cited ==
- Bowden, Mark (1999). Black Hawk Down: A Story of Modern War. Berkeley, CA: Atlantic Monthly Press. ISBN 978-0-87113-738-8. Archived.
- Cawthorne, Nigel (2008). The Mammoth Book of Inside the Elite Forces. London: Robinson Publishing. ISBN 978-1845298210. OCLC 176894746.
- Neville, Leigh (2015). Special Forces in the War on Terror (General Military). Osprey Publishing. ISBN 978-1472807908.
