= Battle of the Argenta Gap =

1945 battle during World War II

- Part of the Spring 1945 offensive in Italy
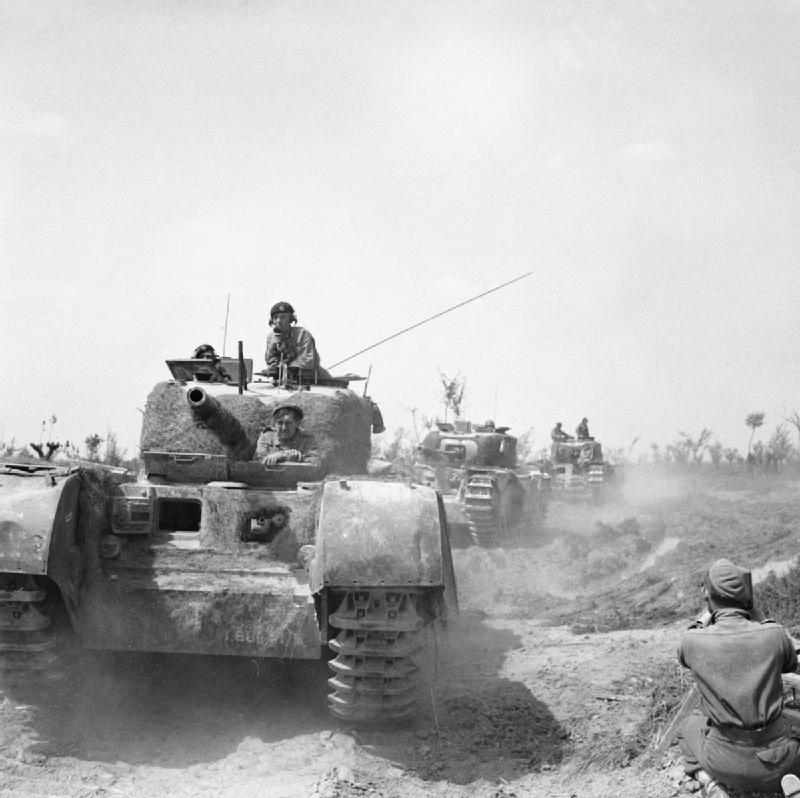
- Churchill tanks advance with the British 56th Infantry Division north-east of Argenta.
Date	12–19 April 1945
Location	Argenta, Emilia–Romagna
Result	Allied victory
Territorial changes	Territory south of the River Po falls into Allied hands.

Belligerents
United Kingdom	Germany

Commanders and leaders
(United Kingdom) Charles Keightley	(Germany) Gerhard von Schwerin

Casualties and losses
625 dead	Over 3,000 prisoners taken

The Battle of the Argenta Gap, or Operation Buckland, was an engagement which formed part of the Allied spring 1945 offensive during the Italian campaign in the final stages of the Second World War. It took place in northern Italy from 12 to 19 April 1945 between troops of British V Corps commanded by Lieutenant-General Charles Keightley and German units of LXXVI Panzer Corps commanded by Lieutenant General (General der Panzertruppe) Gerhard von Schwerin.

The battle saw the Allies bypass the last series of river defences facing them and break out into the Po plains.

== Background ==
The Allied invasion of Italy occurred during September 1943, for a number of key reasons not least important of which was that support for the war in Italy had been declining and it was thought that an invasion would hasten the efforts of the new government that had deposed Benito Mussolini, which was seeking peace. Furthermore, the weakening of Axis control of the Mediterranean supply routes eased the pressure on Allied forces operating in the Middle and Far East, as well as on the efforts to supply to Soviet Union.

Operation Husky – the invasion of Sicily in July 1943 – was successful, serving as a springboard for the invasion of the mainland. In September, the first Allied troops to land in Italy were of the British Eighth Army under the then General Bernard Montgomery, in Operation Baytown. Further landings on 9 September 1943 saw the main attack force landing, despite the Italian surrender to the Allied forces on the previous day. After securing the beachheads, the U.S. Fifth Army began its advance northwards.

By the winter of 1944–45 the Allied armies had penetrated the main defences of the Gothic Line but had failed to break out into the Po river valley. A new major offensive was planned for the spring of 1945, when improving weather would allow the Allies to take advantage of their superior airpower and armoured and motorized ground forces.

== Order of battle ==
Formations and units involved in the battle:

- 15th Army Group – Lieutenant General Mark Clark
  - British Eighth Army – Lieutenant-General Richard McCreery
    - British V Corps – Lieutenant-General Charles Keightley
      - 56th (London) Infantry Division – Major-General John Y. Whitfield
        - 24th Guards Brigade
        - 167th (London) Infantry Brigade
        - 169th (London) Infantry Brigade
        - 2nd Commando Brigade (under command)
        - 9th Armoured Brigade(under command)
      - 78th Infantry Division – Major-General Keith Arbuthnott
        - 11th Infantry Brigade
        - 36th Infantry Brigade
        - 38th (Irish) Infantry Brigade
        - 2nd Armoured Brigade (under command)
- German Army Group C – General (Generaloberst) Heinrich von Vietinghoff
  - German Tenth Army – Lieutenant-General (General der Panzertruppe) Traugott Herr
    - LXXVI Panzer Corps – Lieutenant-General (General der Panzertruppe) Gerhard von Schwerin
      - 162nd (Turkestan) Infantry Division – Major-General (Generalleutnant) Ralph von Heygendorff
      - 42nd Jäger Division – Major-General (Generalleutnant) Walter Jost
      - 362nd Infantry Division – Brigadier-General (Generalmajor) Alois Weber
    - In Army reserve
      - 29th Panzergrenadier Division – Major-General (Generalleutnant) Fritz Polack

== Prelude ==
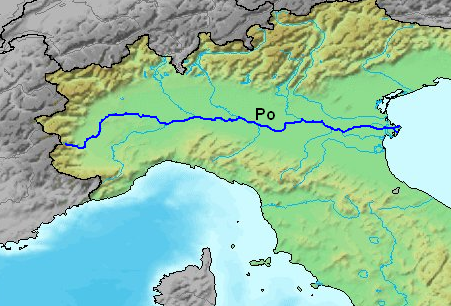
The location of the Po River.

As a preliminary to the main operation, a commando assault (Operation Roast) was launched across Lake Comacchio on 1 April to secure the right flank of the Eighth Army for the coming battle to seize "the Spit", the narrow isthmus between the eastern shore of Lake Comacchio and the Adriatic Sea. This would secure the eastern flank of the Eighth Army and also allow trials to be carried out in secret of the suitability of using newly arrived LVT tracked landing craft for subsequent larger operations in the muddy and difficult conditions of Lake Comacchio. The operation was successful, although the LVTs failed dismally, becoming hopelessly bogged down. It was in this raid that Corporal Thomas Peck Hunter of 43 Commando posthumously received the Victoria Cross for his actions. Two nights later further actions by the Special Boat Service (SBS) supported by Italian Partisans of the 28th Garibaldi Brigade captured islands in the middle of the lake. Danish national, Major Anders Lassen a patrol commander of the Special Boat Service (SBS) was killed in a subsequent fighting reconnaissance and was awarded a Victoria Cross posthumously.

The 56th Infantry Division also made a preliminary attack on 5/6 April to secure its starting line for the Argenta gap operation. By 8 April, after meeting stiff resistance, it had completed its task in clearing "the Wedge", an area from the southern tip of Lake Comacchio where it meets the Reno river to the Fossa di Navigazione.

The main Eighth Army offensive across the Senio river commenced on 9 April and by 12 April the assault units had advanced to consolidate across the Santerno river and allow 78th Infantry Division to pass through towards the Reno river and the Argenta gap. The Argenta Gap was a well defended strip of land some 2 miles (3.2 km) wide and 8 miles (13 km) deep between Lake Comacchio and the Lombardy marshes, south of the town of Ferrara.

== The battle ==
Map of the Argenta Gap showing the Allied lines of advance.

On the night of 10/11 April, British V Corps launched Operation Impact Plain to widen and deepen its bridgehead in the Wedge: 40th (Royal Marine) Commando advanced along the raised causeway bordering the lake while, from 56th (London) Division, 169th (Queen's) Brigade advanced on the commando's left across the flooded margins of the lake with two battalions in LVTs. The 56th Division's 167th Brigade advanced from the Wedge along the Reno flood banks. The commando column met stiff resistance at the bridge north east of Menate and took heavy casualties but were able to take the objective with the assistance of air support. 42nd Jaeger Division seems to have been taken by surprise by their opponents' amphibious capacity and seemed somewhat unnerved by the LVTs emerging from the water so that by daylight on 12 April all three columns had made some 4 miles (6.4 km) headway, linking up in the Menate-Longastrino area. 169th Brigade then pushed forward on the road towards Filo and 167th Brigade continued up the Reno, rolling up the German defences as far as the confluence with the Santerno river to link with the Italian Cremona Combat Group which had advanced from the south.

Reacting to the Allied attack, von Vietinghof ordered 29th Panzergrenadier Division south to reinforce the Argenta gap. Its 15th Panzergrenadier Regiment arrived to reinforce 42nd Jaeger Division on 12 April but the rest of the division had been north of the Po and, delayed by air damage and fuel shortages was not in position until 14 April.

Early on 13 April the 38th (Irish) Brigade, of 78th Battleaxe Division, attacked northward from Indian 8th Division's bridgehead across the Santerno river with the objective of seizing a bridgehead across the Reno at Bastia, in the mouth of the Argenta gap. Meanwhile, to their right, 56th Infantry Division launched the second phase of its operation, Impact Royal. This involved No. 9 Commando of 2nd Commando Brigade and 24th Guards Brigade advancing up the flooded margins of Lake Comacchio in LVTs to concentrate near Chiesa del Bando, 6 miles (9.7 km) north west of Menate and develop a threat to Argenta which lay some 3 miles (4.8 km) to the south west of this objective. A foothold was established on the Fossa Marina, a canal running roughly east to west from Argenta to the lake and a 1 mile (1.6 km) short of their objective but then the newly arrived 15th Panzer Grenadier Regiment blocked further progress and an attempt to take the bridge across the Fossa on 14 April was beaten back.

In the morning of 14 April forward elements of 38th Brigade had crossed the bridge over the Reno at Bastia but had been forced back by an armoured counterattack. It was decided to confine immediate activity to mopping up south of the Reno and await the approach of 167th Brigade which, advancing on both banks of the Reno, would shortly threaten the flank of the defenders north of the river in Bastia and oblige them to retire. Rather than wait for the bridge at Bastia to be cleared, V Corps commander, Lieutenant-General Charles Keightley ordered 78th Division's 11th Infantry Brigade to use 56th Division's bridges over the Reno in order to get forward towards Argenta without delay.

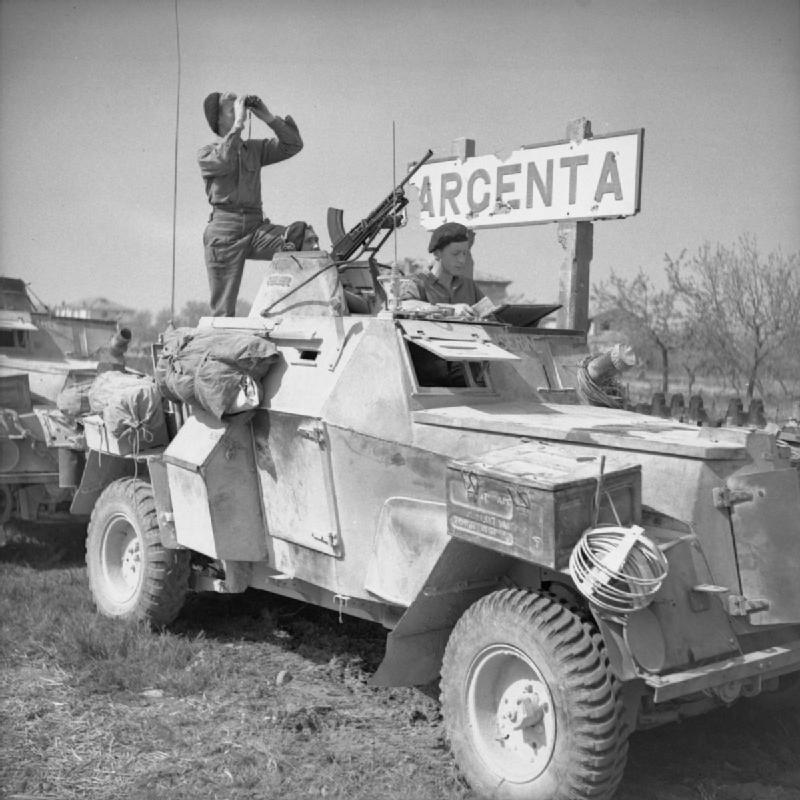
Men of 56th Reconnaissance Regiment, of 78th Division, with a Humber Light Reconnaissance Car in Argenta, 18 April 1945.

On 15/16 April 56th Division renewed their attack on the Fossa Marina but failed again. However, the cumulative effect of heavy air attacks since 13 April took their toll and on the night of 16 April the 24th Guards Brigade were able to cross the canal with relatively little trouble although their advance was once again halted by resistance about 0.5 miles (800 m) north of the canal. On the west side of the Argenta gap 11th Brigade was able to get across the Fossa Marina east of Argenta. The 2nd Battalion, Lancashire Fusiliers were able to hold on to a small bridgehead under heavy fire and counterattack while engineers positioned ARK armoured mobile bridges to allow supporting tanks to cross the canal. (Note: 29th Panzergrenadier Division's history states that the Argenta gap battle was effectively decided by the breaching of the Fossa Marina by 78th Division.)

On 17 April 38th (Irish) Brigade arrived from newly cleared Bastia and passed through 11th Brigade's bridgehead, tasked with widening the bridgehead to provide space to allow an armoured breakout. By dark the brigade had advanced 1,000 yards (910 m) against determined resistance, working around the rear of Argenta. Meanwhile, 11th Brigade advanced into the town to clear it with the support of Crocodile armoured flame-throwers. An armoured counterattack early on 18 April was forced back towards 38th (Irish) Brigade. Meanwhile, on the west outskirts of the town the bridges over the Reno had been attacked and captured by 2nd Commando Brigade which had been advancing up the line of the river from Bastia. Attempted counterattacks on the bridges were broken up by supporting artillery. Also on 17 April 56th Division's 169th (Queen's) Brigade was passed through 11th Brigade's bridgehead across the Fossa Marina in order to drive eastwards to clear the north bank of the canal and link with the Guards Brigade.

On 18 April 78th Division brought forward 36th Infantry Brigade from reserve to pass through 38th (Irish) Brigade and conduct a series of right hooks north of Argenta. By dawn the brigade had reached Consandolo some 4 miles (6.4 km) northwest of Argenta, where German resistance stubbornly held until well into the afternoon. Meanwhile, a mobile force under the command of 2nd Armoured Brigade Headquarters comprising one infantry battalion, a tank regiment, a regiment of armoured personnel carriers and supporting self-propelled guns and assault engineers (the "Kangaroo Army") was brought forward and, bypassing Consandolo, secured a bridgehead over the Fossa Benvignante 1 mile (1.6 km)north of the town. Advanced elements then pushed forward and before dark overran the artillery gun lines of 42nd Jaeger Division.

The 78th Division's advance created flank pressure on the German units facing 56th Division so that at midday on 18 April 169th (Queen's) Brigade detected a lessening resistance in front of them. Pushing forward, the brigade advanced to the Fossa Benvignante and captured a bridge intact. To their right the 24th Guards Brigade were finally able to clear Chiesa del Bando and advance towards the Fossa Benvignante as well.

== Aftermath ==
With 56th and 78th Division now clear of the northern end of the Argenta gap, British 6th Armoured Division, from Eighth Army reserve, was released through the left wing of the advancing 78th Division to swing left to race north west along the line of the river Reno to Bondeno and link up with the U.S. Fifth Army units advancing north from west of Bologna and to complete the encirclement of the German armies defending Bologna. Effective Allied bombing of the crossings of the Po and shortage of fuel left much of the German Army Group's strength and almost all its heavy equipment and armament stranded south of the river, sealing its fate. On 29 April an instrument of surrender was signed by German emissaries at Allied Army HQ and hostilities formally ceased on 2 May.

== War Cemetery ==
An Allied war cemetery is now located at Argenta.

=== Notable burials ===
- Arthur Banks GC
- Tom Hunter (VC)
- Anders Lassen VC, MC

== Bibliography ==
- Dictionary of Battles
