= Caesar C line =

German defence line during WW2

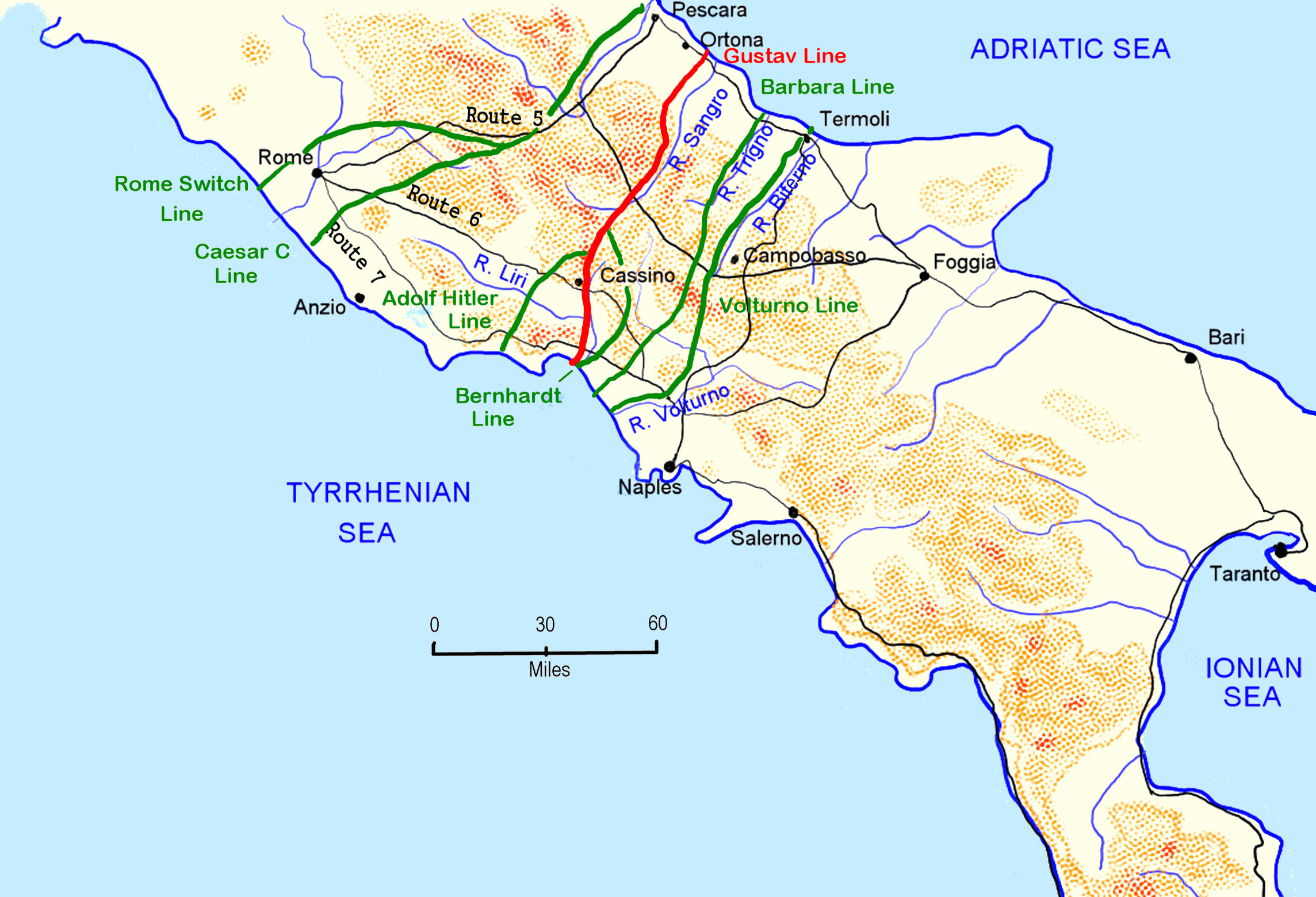
German prepared defensive lines south of Rome

The Caesar Line was the last German line of defence in Italy before Rome during the Italian Campaign of the Second World War.

== Geography ==
The extended from the west coast near Ostia, over the Alban Hills south of Rome, from Valmontone to Avezzano and then to Pescara on the Adriatic coast. Behind the western half of the line was a subsidiary line, the Roman switch line which took a path north of Rome.

== Roman switch line (subsidiary line) ==
The Roman switch line was a line of defense that branched off the Caesar C line and running north of Rome towards coast of the Tyrrhenian Sea. The next line was Trasimene Line in central Italy which was intended to delay the Allies and allow the completion of the Gothic Line a major defensive works north of Florence.

== Breach of the line ==
When the Caesar C Line defences, manned by the German 14th Army, were breached by the U.S. Fifth Army on 30 May 1944, following the breakout from Anzio, the road to Rome was finally opened and Rome fell on 4 June.

The Germans retreated to their next line of defence, the Trasimene Line where the 14th Army re-aligned with the German 10th Army before withdrawing to the formidable defences of the Gothic Line.

== See also ==
- Battle of Anzio
