= LXXVI Panzer Corps =

- Active: 22 July 1943 – 2 May 1945
- Country: Nazi Germany
- Branch: Army
- Type: Panzer corps
- Role: Armoured warfare
- Size: Corps

Commanders
- Notable commanders: General der Panzertruppe Traugott Herr

The LXXVI Panzer Corps (LXXVI Panzerkorps, 76th Armoured Corps) was a panzer corps of Nazi Germany during World War II. The headquarters were formed in France under Army Group D on 29 June 1943 as LXXVI Army Corps but renamed a month later. In August it shipped to Italy to become part of 10th Army. It spent the rest of the war in Italy fighting in the Italian Campaign mainly under 10th Army but with short periods from February 1944 (Battle of Anzio) and January 1945 (Spring 1945 offensive in Italy) under 14th Army. The Corps was commanded for most of its active fighting by General Traugott Herr.

== Order of battle ==
In 1943 the corps included:

- 1st Parachute Division
- 26th Panzer Division
- 65th Infantry Division
- 90th Panzergrenadier Division

On 25 August 1944 the composition of the corps was:

- 1st Parachute Division
- 278th Infantry Division
- 71st Infantry Division
- 5th Mountain Division
- 162nd Turkestan Division

== Commanding officers ==
- Lieutenant-General (Generalleutnant) Traugott Herr, 23 July - 31 August 1943 (acting)
- General of Armoured troops (General der Panzertruppe) Traugott Herr, 1 September 1943 – 28 February 1944
- Lieutenant-General Dietrich von Choltitz, 28 February 1944 – 15 April 1944 (acting)
- General of Armoured troops Traugott Herr, 15 April 1944 – 23 November 1944
- Lieutenant-General Friedrich-Wilhelm Hauck, 24 November - 16 December 1944 (acting)
- General of Armoured troops Traugott Herr, 17–26 December 1944
- Lieutenant-General Gerhard Graf von Schwerin, 27 December 1944 - 31 March 1945 (acting)
- General of Armoured troops Gerhard Graf von Schwerin, 31 March – 25 April 1945
- Lieutenant-General Karl von Graffen, 25 April 1945 – 8 May 1945 (acting)

== Area of operations ==
Date	Area	Subordinate to	Operations
July 1943	France	Army Group D
August 1943	Italy	OB Sud
September 1943	Italy	10th Army	Salerno, Cassino
3 February 1944	Italy	14th Army	Anzio
6 June 1944	Italy	10th Army	Central Italy, Florence and Bologna
January 1945	Italy	14th Army	north-eastern Italy

Source: Lexicon der Wehrmacht and Axis History Factbook
