= Gerhard von Schwerin =

German general

Gerhard Graf von Schwerin
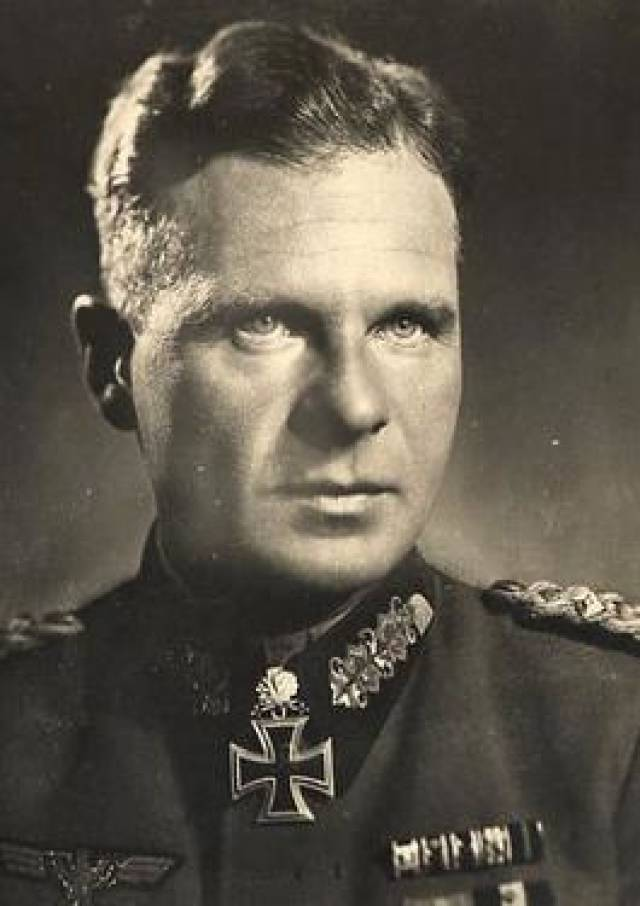
- Born: 23 June 1899; Hanover, German Empire
- Died: 29 October 1980 (aged 81); Rottach-Egern, Bavaria, West Germany
- Military career
- Allegiance: German Empire; Weimar Republic; Nazi Germany; West Germany
- Branch: German Army
- Service years: 1914–1920; 1923–1945
- Rank: General der Panzertruppe
- Conflicts: World War I; World War II; Battle of Aachen
- Awards: Knight's Cross of the Iron Cross with Oak Leaves and Swords
- Other work: Political advisor (CDU); Political advisor (FDP)

Gerhard Helmut Detleff Graf von Schwerin (23 June 1899 – 29 October 1980) was a German General der Panzertruppe during World War II.

== World War I ==
Gerhard von Schwerin was born to a Prussian aristocratic family in 1899. His father was a civil official in the Prussian State Government. At the age of 15 he entered the military cadet school at Koslin. Joining the Prussian Army's 2nd Foot Guards Regiment as a Fähnrich (commissioned officer cadet), he subsequently transferred to the 2nd (1st Pomeranian) Grenadier Regiment.

He saw action with the infantry on both the Eastern and Western fronts in 1918 whilst still a teenager, serving as a company commander and battalion adjutant. He was wounded in action on 26 September 1918, and hospitalized until the war's end in November 1918. In 1918 he was awarded the Iron Cross for gallantry in action, both 2nd Class and 1st Class.

== Inter-war years ==
Schwerin was discharged from the army in 1920. He spent the following two years engaged in a managerial business apprenticeship with a coffee import firm in Bremen, and a petroleum company in Berlin. In 1922 he rejoined the Reichswehr as a professional soldier, being commissioned with the rank of lieutenant into the Prussian Army's Infantry Regiment No.1. In 1931 he joined Infantry Regiment No.18 in Paderborn. He was promoted to captain in June 1933. From 1933 to 1935 he attended the General Staff course at the Prussian Military Academy in Berlin.

Whilst Schwerin was at the academy the German Chancellor Adolf Hitler seized autocratic governing power in a paramilitary political revolution in Berlin, abolished the Weimar Republic state with the passing into law of the Enabling Act of 1933, and declared an ideological militarist dictatorship described as the Third Reich, fundamentally altering the post-World War political order in Europe.

In October 1938 Schwerin was promoted to the rank of major. At the end of the 1930s he was a staff-officer with Oberkommando des Heeres (Supreme High Command on the German Army).

In January 1939, whilst working at the UK/US intelligence section of the German War Ministry at the German Embassy in London, Schwerin made a clandestine personal approach to the British Government, suggesting that if it abandoned its policy of appeasement towards the Third Reich, and instead moved to a stance of open military opposition towards its escalating aggression in central Europe, this would provide a rallying point and catalyst for elements in the German military who were at that time considering launching a coup d'etat against the National Socialist government of Adolf Hitler. At a dinner party in Marylebone hosted by Admiral Sir Aubrey Smith, Schwerin met James Stuart, representing the British Government, Admiral John Godfrey, head of naval intelligence, and General Sir James Marshall-Cornwall, Director-General of air and coastal defence, to warn them of Hitler's intention to invade Poland. Along with the suggestion that Great Britain's and Germany's best interests would be served by Neville Chamberlain being replaced as prime minister by Winston Churchill, Schwerin advocated that pressure for an internal military coup by anti-Nazi elements of the Wehrmacht, of which he was aware, could be induced by the deployment of a squadron of Royal Navy battleships taking up a hostile position off Germany's Northern shore in the Baltic Sea, and by the Royal Air Force moving elements of its Bomber Command to a pre-battle theatre station in French airfields, as a means of indicating the British Empire's ultimate willingness for a confrontation with the Nazis. This politico-military strategy was communicated to Chamberlain but was rejected as being too aggressive at that point as a way of dealing with the gathering menace of the Third Reich. However, Schwerin's representations to the British Government may have contributed to its collective assessments which were ongoing at that time as to how to deal with Adolf Hitler, and to the decision to make a stand on the Polish border eight months later rather than somewhere else. Frank Roberts, an official in the Foreign Office's German Department who also dealt with the issue, light-heartedly – in spite of the risk that Schwerin had taken in making such a move on the eve of war, which would constitute high treason and a capital crime in the Third Reich's jurisdiction if it was discovered – dismissed the subject of Schwerin's approaches as being an internal matter for the German high command. In April 1939 Schwerin was promoted to the rank of lieutenant colonel.

== World War II ==
On return to Germany, as the war was declared a few months later in September 1939, which his manoeuvring in London had failed to avert, Schwerin assumed duties as a frontline German military officer, and what followed was an extensive campaign career which took him from fighting in the Low Countries and France to North Africa, Russia to Germany and Italy.

He received command of the 1st Battalion Motorized Infantry Regiment of the Grossdeutschland Division on the war's outbreak, and took part of the invasion and defeat of France in 1940 (elements of troops under his command in this unit committed two massacres of disarmed French Imperial African Senegalese Tirailleurs whom they had captured as prisoners of war during the invasion). He also commanded up to 1941 the Rifle Regiment No.86, and the Grossdeutschland Regiment.

Whilst with the Afrika Korps on 7 April 1941, commanding the Special Purposes Regiment No. 200, Schwerin led a long-range joint German and Italian commando force deep into the British Empire's lines in Libya to capture the Mechili oasis, heralding the Afrika Korps' entry into operations in North Africa under the leadership of Erwin Rommel, which resulted in almost 3000 British Imperial prisoners of war being rounded-up, three generals in their number.

In late 1941 he returned to Europe to take part in Operation Barbarossa, commanding Infantry Regiment No. 76 in the charge Eastwards into the Soviet Union, for which he received the Knight's Cross in January 1942. From April to May 1942 he briefly commanded the 254th Infantry Brigade, before being appointed to the command of the 8th Jaeger Division in mid-1942 on the Eastern Front. In October 1942 he was promoted to the rank of major-general. From November 1942 he commanded the 16th Panzer Grenadier Division on the Eastern Front (being promoted to the rank of lieutenant-general in June 1943), being involved in the fighting around Stalingrad, and subsequently being awarded the Oak Leaves and also the Swords of the Knight's Cross (personally presented by Adolf Hitler at a ceremony in the Berghof on Schwerin's arrival back in Germany) for his handling of the Division during the retreat from Russia whilst harried continually by overwhelming pursuing Soviet forces.

The 16th Panzer Grenadier Division was transferred to France in March 1944, the unit being militarily upgraded to become the 116th Panzer Division. During the fighting with the American and British Empire forces that had entered France in 1944, Schwerin was temporarily removed from the command of 116th Division after a difference of opinion with a superior, but was re-appointed to the post shortly afterwards:

=== Normandy ===
The 116th Panzer Division started crossing the Seine on 20 July 1944. Schwerin attacked the American positions between Beaucoudroy and Percy, retaking the former town, but failing to take Mont Robin. In effect, the division had difficulty advancing in the Normandy landscape. Schwerin complained "Of the 120 armoured vehicles in this area, only a few managed to form a spearhead along the road. Most of the tanks can't cross this land infested with hedges and brushwood. Long queues form behind them. Precious time is lost. The Panzer IV have proven as luckless as the Panthers because they're too wide for the roads we've taken. They find themselves caught between the narrow and high embankments. All these can't be freed, and can't be deployed." He blamed Hans von Funck for his failure to take Mont Robin.

==== Operation Luttich ====
On 4 August, he confronted Raymond O. Barton and Manton S. Eddy near Sourdeval. On 6 August, Schwerin was given the mission of advancing toward Brecey as part of Operation Luttich the following morning, but on 7 August the US 28th Infantry Division attacked the 84th Infantry Division at Gathemo to the right of Schwerin's division. Schwerin, thus exposed to an attack on his right flank, maintained his defensive position, only dedicating half his forces to the mission, a quarter of them after a five-hour delay. On 8 and 9 August, the Allies bombed Sourdeval to cut off Schwerin's supplies. With the failure of the operation, Funck replaced Schwerin.

=== Battle of Aachen ===
As the American Army's advance crossed the Belgian border into Germany, it approached the town of Aachen where the remnants of Schwerin's 116th Panzer Division were deployed. By this time, 116th "Division" had been reduced to 600 men, twelve serviceable tanks and was bereft of artillery guns. Coming to the conclusion that his force didn't possess the strength to deny the town to the Allies, and an attempt to do so would be a tactically futile loss of life and endangerment of the town's civilians, several thousand of whom had not been evacuated from what was now about to become the fighting line, and also to try to protect the city's historical architecture and relics from being destroyed - Aachen being the ancient capital and crowning site of the kings of the Holy Roman Empire - Schwerin unilaterally decided to withdraw from Aachen and declare it an open town without seeking approval from superior command, in a manner similar to what General Dietrich von Choltitz had done in Paris two weeks earlier.

Schwerin wrote a communique, which he left at the town's post office, for the approaching American commander notifying him of this decision and requesting that he treat the remaining German civilian population humanely. As he was preparing to abandon the town, Schwerin received intelligence from senior command headquarters informing him that the American advance appeared to have halted to re-group, a large scale attack upon Aachen in consequence was not imminent, and notifying him that reinforcements were en route to him for the town's defense. At this moment, an American reconnaissance force appeared in the South-West suburb of Aachen, which Schwerin received orders to counter-attack and bar from entering the town, which he complied with, ordering the 116th Division's grenadiers to engage it and force it back out. Given the rapidly changing situation, he dispatched an officer to retrieve the 'open town' communique that he had left at the post office, but by this time it had fallen into the hands of roaming Schutzstaffel security police operating in Aachen under the personal authority of Adolf Hitler, who had been sent in to stiffen resistance against any signs of wavering in the line by the German Army's officer corps. On reading the communique's content, they ordered Schwerin be immediately relieved of command and placed under close-arrest, and organized Colonel Gerhard Wilck being sent in to replace him at the head of the 116th Division.

=== Italian Front and surrender ===
With the aid of Field Marshals Gerd von Rundstedt and Walter Model, Schwerin received only a severe reprimand for his actions at Aachen. He was then ordered to the Italian front to take over the command of the LXXVI Panzerkorps in December 1944. At the beginning of April 1945 he was promoted to the rank of General of Panzer Troops. On 26 April 1945 he was captured on the Italian front by the British Army, becoming a prisoner of war. He was released from post-war Allied military custody in late 1947.

== Post-war ==
In May 1950 Schwerin was appointed to the post of chief advisor on military issues and security policy to the Chancellor Konrad Adenauer, and head of the covert government agency Dienststelle Schwerin (with the code name "Zentrale für Heimatdienst"), responsible for the reconstruction of West Germany's military whilst under American occupation during the Cold War. However, after he talked to the press about his work he was replaced by Theodor Blank in October 1950. Schwerin subsequently was active as an advisor on military policy for the parliamentary group of the Free Democratic Party of Germany.

Schwerin sought to augment his Prussian Officer anti-Nazi credentials in West Germany's post-war political environment on the basis of his initial decision to withdraw from Aachen in the September 1944 fighting by styling himself as the "Saviour of Aachen" (although substantial fighting and destruction had occurred in the town in the subsequent Battle of Aachen after his arrest and removal from the scene). This narrative found some acceptance, with his being granted the honour by the town of having a street 'Graf Schwerin Strasse' (Count Schwerin's Street) named after him and being given civic awards at ceremonies held there in the 1950s and 1970s. The honour of the street name was withdrawn in 2008 after local political opposition in the town, upon the basis that while Schwerin was briefly Aachen's military commandant, two 14-year-old boys had been summarily executed for looting. The name of the street was in consequence changed to the 'Kornelimünsterweg'.

== Personal life ==
Schwerin was married three times. The first marriage was with Herta Kannengiesser; the second was with Julia Zulich, two children resulting: Gabrielle (b. August 1932) and Christian (b. January 1939), two grandsons Alex von Rutenberg and Maximilian zu Sayn Wittgenstein. The last marriage was with Esther Klippel. Schwerin died in 1980.

== Awards ==
- Iron Cross (1914) (2nd & 1st Class)
- Clasp to the Iron Cross (1939)
  - 2nd Class (11 May 1940)
  - 1st Class (19 May 1940)
- Knight's Cross of the Iron Cross with Oak Leaves and Swords
  - Knight's Cross on 17 January 1942 as Oberst and commander of Infanterie-Regiment 76 (mot.)
  - 240th Oak Leaves on 17 May 1943 as Generalmajor and commander of the 16th Infantry Division
  - 41st Swords on 4 November 1943 as Generalleutnant and commander of the 16th Panzergrenadier Division

Military offices
Preceded by Generalmajor Gerhard Müller	Commander of 116th Panzer Division; 1 May 1944 – 31 August 1944	Succeeded by Generalmajor Heinrich Voigtsberger
Preceded by Generalleutnat Ernst-Günther Baade	Commander of 90th Grenadier Division (motorised); December 1944 – ?	Succeeded by none
Preceded by General der Panzertruppe Traugott Herr	Commander of LXXVI. Panzerkorps; 26 December 1944 – 25 April 1945	Succeeded by Generalleutnant Karl von Graffen
