= Traugott Herr =

German general

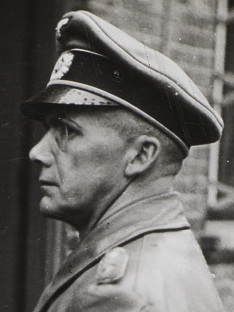
- Born: 16 September 1890; Weferlingen, Kreis Gardelegen, Regierungsbezirk Magdeburg, Province of Saxony, Kingdom of Prussia, German Empire
- Died: 13 April 1976 (aged 85); Achterwehr, Schleswig-Holstein, West Germany
- Relatives: ∞ 1916 Grete Paris; 4 children
- Military career
- Allegiance: Kingdom of Prussia; German Empire; Weimar Republic; Nazi Germany
- Branch: Imperial German Army; Reichsheer; German Army
- Service years: 1911–1945
- Rank: General der Panzertruppe
- Commands: Infantry/Rifle Regiment 66; 13th Rifle Brigade; 13th Panzer Division; LXXVI Panzer Corps; 14th Army; 10th Army
- Conflicts: World War I World War II
- Awards: Knight's Cross of the Iron Cross with Oak Leaves and Swords

Traugott Johannes Gustav Otto Herr (16 September 1890 – 13 April 1976) was a German general during World War II who commanded the 14th Army and the 10th Army of the Wehrmacht. He was a recipient of the Knight's Cross of the Iron Cross with Oak Leaves and Swords.

== Life ==
Born in 1890, Herr joined the Fusilier Regiment Prince Henry of Prussia (Brandenburg) No. 35 of the Prussian Army on 18 April 1911 as a Fahnenjunker (officer candidate) in the infantry. During the First World War, he served as battalion adjutant, regimental adjutant, and company leader. He was wounded on 31 August 1916 and returned to active duty in January 1917.

He served again in the Reichswehr as adjutant, as company commander, and at the infantry school and the war school in Dresden. Serving in the Wehrmacht of Nazi Germany in the late 1930s, he commanded the 3rd Battalion of the 33rd Infantry Regiment.

=== World War II ===
Herr commanded an infantry regiment, part of the 13th Motorized Infantry Division, from 18 September 1939 to 14 October 1940, taking part in the Invasion of Poland (September 1939) and France (May 1940 to October 1940). In October 1940, the division was reformed in Vienna as 13th Panzer Division. Herr was given command of 13th Rifle Brigade, which controlled the division's two infantry regiments, on 14 October 1940.

In May 1941, the regiment returned to Germany to take part in Operation Barbarossa, the invasion of the Soviet Union, as part of 1st Panzergruppe under Paul Ludwig Ewald von Kleist in Army Group South. In December 1941, Herr was given acting command of 13th Panzer Division.

On 31 October 1942, on the Terek River deep in the Caucasus, Herr suffered a serious head wound, being struck by shrapnel, and was repatriated to Germany to recuperate. He was later appointed commander of the LXXVI Panzer Corps stationed in France; in August 1943 it was sent to Italy. In Italy, his unit faced the British Eighth Army in Calabria, and the U.S. Fifth Army in Salerno.

Herr commanded the corps in the Italian Campaign until 24 November 1944. He also temporarily took command of 14th Army for a brief period from late November to mid-December 1944. On 18 December 1944, he was awarded the Swords to the Knight's Cross. On 15 February 1945, he took command of 10th Army. The Allies final and decisive spring 1945 offensive in Italy opened in early April, Herr was defending the Adriatic sector with orders to hold the lines. On 2 May 1945, Army Group C under, including the 10th and 14th Armies, surrendered, thus ending the fighting, and General Herr was taken prisoner of war. He was repatriated in May 1948.

== Promotions ==
- 18 April 1911 Fahnenjunker (Officer Candidate)
- 9 August 1911 Fahnenjunker-Unteroffizier (Officer Candidate with Corporal/NCO/Junior Sergeant rank)
- 19 December 1911 Fähnrich (Officer Cadet)
- 18 August 1912 Leutnant (2nd Lieutenant)
- 28 November 1917 Oberleutnant (1st Lieutenant)
- 5 January 1926 Hauptmann (Captain) with effect and Rank Seniority (RDA) from 1 January 1926 (7)
- 1 June 1934 Major (22)
- 2 October 1936 Oberstleutnant (Lieutenant Colonel) with effect and RDA from 1 October 1936 (61)
- 31 July 1939 Oberst (Colonel) with effect and RDA from 1 August 1939 (32)
  - 17 December 1941 received new and improved RDA from 1 April 1938 (12a)
- 16 March 1942 Generalmajor (Major General) with effect and RDA from 1 April 1942 (16)
- 15 February 1943 Generalleutnant (Lieutenant General) with effect and RDA from 1 December 1942 (19a)
- 8 September 1943 General der Panzertruppe with effect and RDA from 1 September 1943 (3)

== Awards and decorations ==
- Iron Cross (1914), 2nd and 1st Class
  - 2nd Class on 14 September 1914
  - 1st Class on 21 October 1915
- House Order of Hohenzollern, Knight's Cross with Swords (HOH3X) on 24 November 1917
- Hamburg Hanseatic Cross (HH) on 15 August 1918
- Wound Badge (1918) in Black on 20 November 1918
- Honour Cross of the World War 1914/1918 with Swords
- Wehrmacht Long Service Award, 4th to 1st Class for 25 years on 2 October 1936
- Hungarian World War Commemorative Medal with Swords
- Sudetenland Medal
- Repetition Clasp 1939 to the Iron Cross 1914, 2nd and 1st Class
  - 2nd Class on 24 September 1939
  - 1st Class on 12 May 1940
- Infantry Assault Badge in Silver
- Winter Battle in the East 1941–42 Medal on 3 August 1942
- Panzer Badge in Silver
- Wound Badge (1939) in Silver on 21 October 1942
- Referenced twice by name in the Wehrmachtbericht on 24 June 1944 and 22 September 1944
- Knight's Cross of the Iron Cross with Oak Leaves and Swords
  - Knight's Cross on 2 October 1941 as Oberst and commander of the 13th Rifle Brigade (13. Schützen-Brigade)
  - 110th Oak Leaves on 9 August 1942 as Generalmajor and Commander of the 13th Panzer Division (13. Panzer-Division)
  - 117th Swords on 18 December 1944 as General der Panzertruppe and Commanding General of the LXXVI Panzer Corps (LXXVI. Panzerkorps)

== Sources ==
- German Federal Archives: BArch PERS 6/191 and PERS 6/299846

Military offices
Preceded by Generalleutnant Walter Düvert	Commander of 13th Panzer Division; 1 December 1941 – 1 November 1942	Succeeded by Generalleutnant Hellmut von der Chevallerie
Preceded by none	Commander of LXXVI Panzer Corps; 17 July 1943 – 26 December 1944	Succeeded by Generalleutnant Gerhard Graf von Schwerin
Preceded by General der Artillerie Heinz Ziegler	Commander of 14th Army; 22 November 1944 – 12 December 1944	Succeeded by General der Infanterie Kurt von Tippelskirch
Preceded by General der Panzertruppe Joachim Lemelsen	Commander of 10th Army; 15 February 1945 – 2 May 1945	Succeeded by none
