= 14th Army (Wehrmacht) =

- German: 14. Armee
- Army insignia
- Active: 1 August – 13 October 1939; 5 November 1943 – 2 May 1945
- Country: Nazi Germany
- Branch: German Army ( Wehrmacht)
- Size: Field army
- Engagements: Second World War; invasion of Poland; Italian Campaign; Battle of Anzio; Battle of Monte Cassino; 1945 Spring offensive

Commanders
- Notable commanders: Wilhelm List; Eberhard von Mackensen; Joachim Lemelsen

The 14th Army (German: 14. Armee) was a German field army in World War II.

== History ==
=== Poland ===
The 14th Army was activated on 1 August 1939 with General Wilhelm List in command and saw service in Poland until the end of the Polish campaign on 13 October 1939.

=== Italy ===
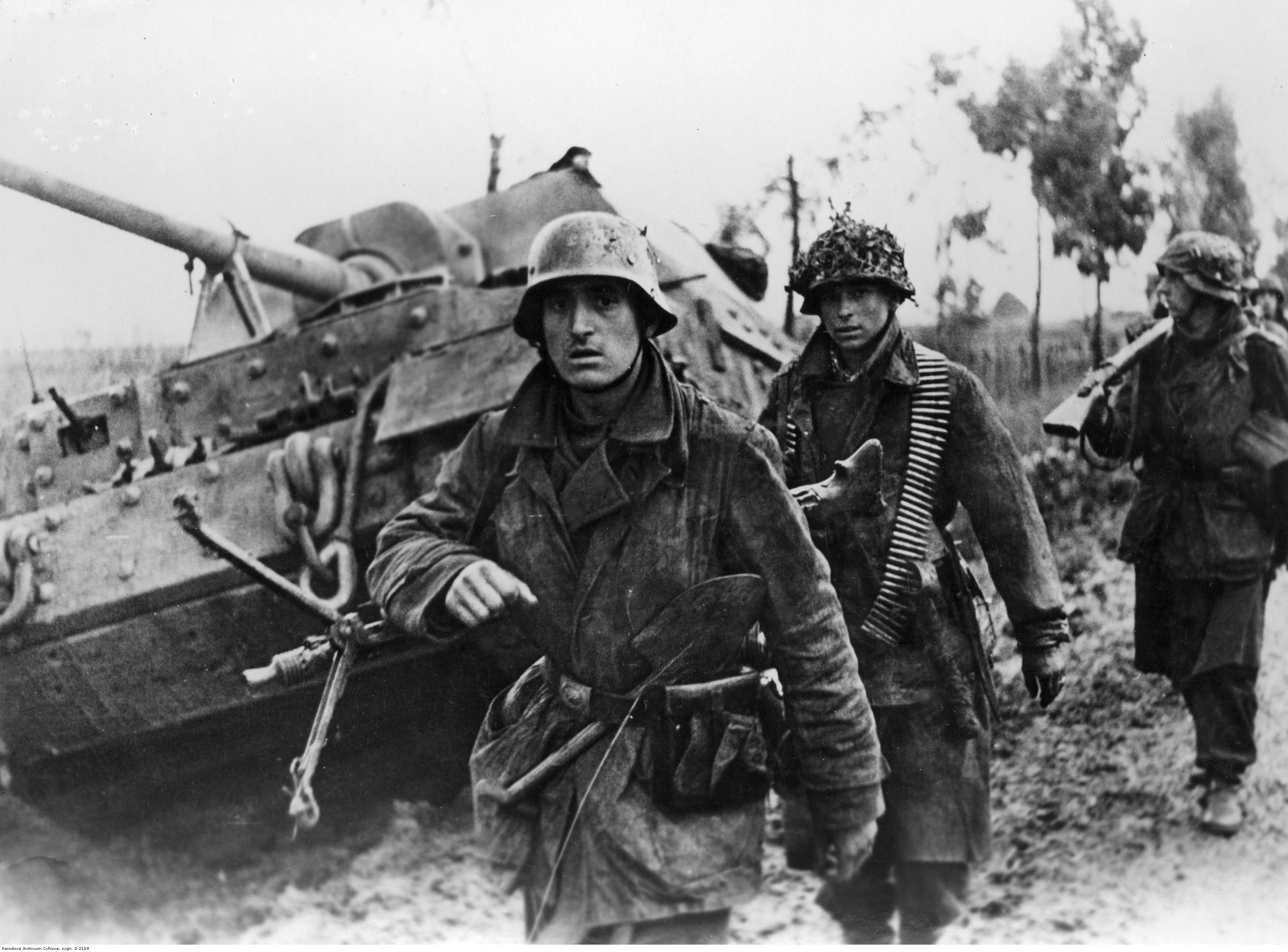
14th Army troops in the Anzio battle

The 14th Army was reactivated for the defence of Italy in late 1943 when its headquarters was created using the headquarters personnel of Army Group B which had been abolished when Albert Kesselring was given command of all Axis troops in Italy. 14th Army was initially responsible for the defence of Rome and dealing with any amphibious landings the Allies might make to the rear of the German 10th Army, which was fighting on the defensive lines south of Rome.

The 14th Army faced the Allied amphibious landings at Anzio in January 1944 and after the Allied breakthrough in May 1944 took part in the fighting retreat to the Gothic Line. The German armies in Italy finally surrendered on 2 May 1945 after being defeated during the Allies' Spring offensive.

== Commanders ==
No.	Portrait	Commander	Took office	Left office	Time in office
1	Wilhelm List	Generaloberst; Wilhelm List (1880–1971)	1 August 1939	13 October 1939	73 days
2	Eberhard von Mackensen	Generaloberst; Eberhard von Mackensen (1889–1969)	5 November 1943	4 June 1944	212 days
3	Joachim Lemelsen	General der Panzertruppe; Joachim Lemelsen (1888–1954)	5 June 1944	15 October 1944	132 days
4	Fridolin von Senger und Etterlin	General der Panzertruppe; Fridolin von Senger und Etterlin (1891–1963)	15 October 1944	24 October 1944	9 days
5	Heinz Ziegler	General der Artillerie; Heinz Ziegler (1894–1972)	24 October 1944	22 November 1944	29 days
6	Traugott Herr	General der Panzertruppe; Traugott Herr (1890–1976)	24 November 1944	16 December 1944	22 days
7	Kurt von Tippelskirch	General der Infanterie; Kurt von Tippelskirch (1891–1957)	16 December 1944	17 February 1945	63 days
(3)	Joachim Lemelsen	General der Panzertruppe; Joachim Lemelsen (1888–1954)	17 February 1945	2 May 1945	74 days

== See also ==
- 14th Army (German Empire) for the equivalent formation in World War I
