= 162nd Turkestan Division =

162nd Turkistan Division Turkistan Division
- Active: May 1943 – May 1945
- Country: Nazi Germany
- Branch: Wehrmacht
- Type: Infantry
- Size: Division
- Engagements: World War II

The 162nd Turkistan Division was a military division that was formed by the German Army during the Second World War. It drew its men from prisoners of war who came from the Caucasus and from Turkic lands further east.

== History ==
The 162nd Turkistan Division was formed in May 1943 and comprised five Azeri and six Turkestan artillery and infantry units. The unit retained many enlisted German personnel, and also contained Georgian and Armenians Osttruppen, although they were collectively referred to as “Turks”. The soldiers were trained at Neuhammer.

The division was sent, in October 1943, to northern Italy. The 162nd became the largest division of all the Ostlegionen. Infantry Battalion No. 450 was also drawn from ethnic Turks and Azeris.

In early 1944 the division was assigned to guard the Ligurian coast and in June 1944 to combat in Italy but was withdrawn due to poor performance. For the remainder of the war, the division fought the Italian resistance movement near Spezia and the Val di Taro in Italy. After initial setbacks, the division proved to be quite effective.

The main body of the division surrendered near Padua in May 1945 to the Western Allies and was dispatched to Taranto. In accordance with the agreements signed by the British and Americans at the Yalta Conference, the soldiers were repatriated to the Soviet Union. According to Nikolai Tolstoy, they received twenty-year sentences of "corrective labor.

== Commanders ==
- Generalmajor Oskar von Niedermayer (13 May 1943 – 21 May 1944)
- Generalleutnant Ralph von Heygendorff (21 May 1944 – 8 May 1945)

== Organisation ==
- 303rd Infantry Regiment (Infanterie-Regiment 303)
- 314th Infantry Regiment (Infanterie-Regiment 314)
- 329th Infantry Regiment (Infanterie-Regiment 329) (only in August 1944)
- 162nd Divisional Battalion (Divisions-Bataillon 162)
- 236rd Artillery Regiment (Artillerie-Regiment 236)
- 936th Pioneer Battalion (Pionier-Bataillon 936)
- 236rd Panzerjäger Battalion (Panzerjäger-Abteilung 236)
- 236rd Aufklärungs Battalion (Aufklärungs-Abteilung 236)
- 236rd Signals Battalion (Infanterie-Divisions-Nachrichten-Abteilung 236)
- 936th Supply Services (Nachschubtruppen 936)

== War crimes ==
The division has been implicated in a number of war crimes in Italy between December 1943 and May 1945, two of those, in January 1945 in the Emilia-Romagna resulted in the execution of at least 20 civilians each.

== See also ==
- Ostlegionen
