= 10th Army (Wehrmacht) =

German field army (1943 to 1945)

- German: 10. Armee
- Insignia of the 10th Army of the Wehrmacht.
- Active: August 6, 1939 – October 10, 1939; August 15, 1943 – May 2, 1945
- Disbanded: October 10, 1939; May 2, 1945
- Country: Nazi Germany
- Branch: German army ( Wehrmacht)
- Type: Field army
- Engagements: World War II

The 10th Army (German: 10. Armee) was a World War II field army of the Wehrmacht (Germany).

A new 10th Army was activated in 1943 in response to the Allied invasion of Italy. It saw action notably in late 1943 and early 1944 along the "Winter Line" at the Battle of San Pietro Infine and the Battle of Monte Cassino, before finally surrendering near the Alps. Among its troops at Cassino were the XIV Panzer Corps and Parachute divisions of the Luftwaffe.

== Commanders ==
No.	Portrait	Commander	Took office	Left office	Time in office
1	Walter von Reichenau	Generaloberst; Walter von Reichenau (1884–1942)	6 August 1939	10 October 1939	65 days
2	Heinrich von Vietinghoff	Generaloberst; Heinrich von Vietinghoff (1887–1952)	15 August 1943	24 October 1944	1 year, 70 days
3	Joachim Lemelsen	General der Panzertruppe; Joachim Lemelsen (1888–1954)	24 October 1944	15 February 1945	114 days
4	Traugott Herr	General der Panzertruppe; Traugott Herr (1890–1976)	15 February 1945	2 May 1945	76 days

== See also ==
- 10th Army (German Empire) for the equivalent formation in World War I
