= Regimental Military Intelligence Battalion =

US Army unit

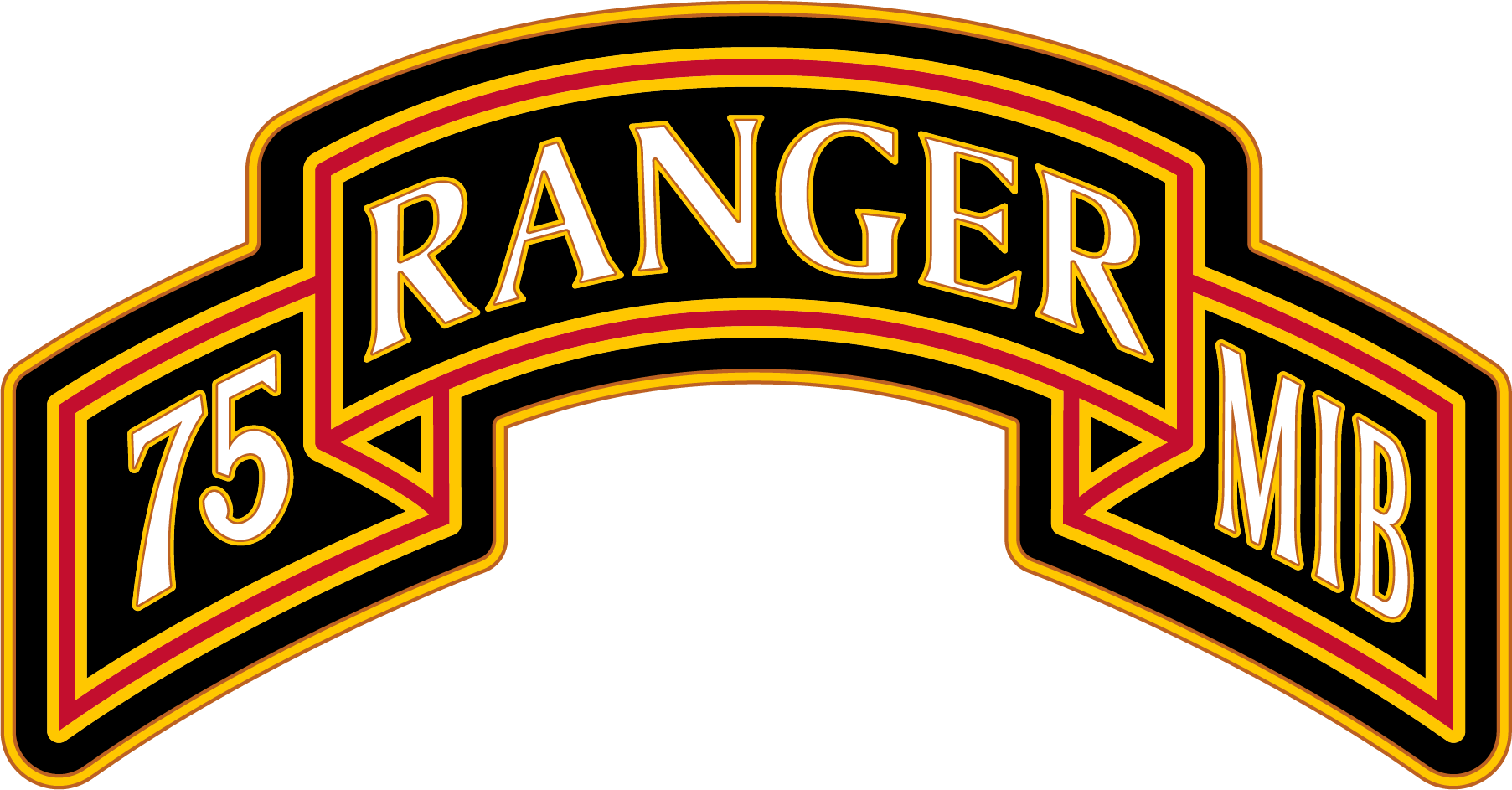
- Battalion Scroll/Combat Service Identification Badge
- Active: 22 May 2017 – Present
- Country: United States
- Allegiance: United States Army
- Type: Special operations force
- Role: Intelligence, Surveillance, Reconnaissance, Cyber warfare & Electronic warfare
- Size: Classified
- Part of: 75th Ranger Regiment
- Garrison/HQ: Fort Benning, Georgia
- Engagements: War on terror Operation Enduring Freedom

Insignia
- 75th Ranger Regiment Beret Flash

The Regimental Military Intelligence Battalion, 75th Ranger Regiment is a combat support unit of the United States Army's 75th Ranger Regiment, providing intelligence, surveillance, reconnaissance, cyber, and electronic warfare capabilities. The battalion consists of three primary elements based at Fort Benning, Georgia; a headquarters company, a military intelligence company, and a cyber/electromagnetic activities company.

The battalion was formed as a provisional unit 22 May 2017, and became a permanent part of the Regiment 16 June 2020.

== History ==
The battalion’s mission is to recruit, train, develop, and employ highly trained and specialized Rangers to conduct full spectrum intelligence, surveillance, reconnaissance, cyber, and electronic warfare operations in order to enhance the Regimental Commander’s situational awareness and inform his decision-making process. Presently, the RMIB consists of a headquarters detachment and two companies.

The staff and command group are embedded within the Headquarters and Headquarters Detachment. It leads the Regiment’s recruitment and management of intelligence Rangers, synchronizes intelligence training and operations across the Regiment and with other special operations and conventional forces, and also provides intelligence support to the Regimental staff.

The Military Intelligence Company possesses a diverse mix of capabilities which include all-source analysts, geospatial analysts, human intelligence collectors, counterintelligence agents, and unmanned aerial systems. This enables the company to conduct multi-discipline collection and production, expeditionary imagery collection and processing, exploitation, and dissemination of raw data, and all-source analysis, to further enable the Regiment’s training and operations.

The Cyber Electromagnetic Activities Company integrates and synchronizes cyber, electronic warfare, signals intelligence, and technical surveillance in support of the Regimental Commander’s objectives. The CEMA Company represents a new approach in line with the Army’s intent of fielding a modernized force capable of operations on any front. The multi-domain concept provides a non-linear approach where all events can occur across the environment at any time. CEMA places emphasis on innovation, technological advancement and electronic pursuit to support real time operations against any threat, digital or otherwise.

== Organization ==
Battalion organization and NATO map symbols.

=== Military Intelligence Company ===
The Military Intelligence Company possesses a diverse mix of capabilities which include all-source analysts, geospatial analysts, human intelligence collectors, counterintelligence agents, and unmanned aerial systems. This enables the company to conduct multi-discipline collection and production, expeditionary imagery collection and ‘PED’ (processing, exploitation, and dissemination) of raw data, and all-source analysis, to further enable the Regiment’s training and operations.

=== Cyber Electromagnetic Activities Company ===
The Cyber Electromagnetic Activities (CEMA) Company integrates and synchronizes cyber, electronic warfare, signals intelligence (SIGINT), and technical surveillance in support of the Regimental Commander’s objectives. The CEMA Company represents a new approach in line with the Army’s intent of fielding a modernized force capable of operations on any front. The multi-domain concept provides a non-linear approach where all events can occur across the environment at any time. CEMA places emphasis on innovation, technological advancement, and electronic pursuit to support real time operations against any threat, digital or otherwise.

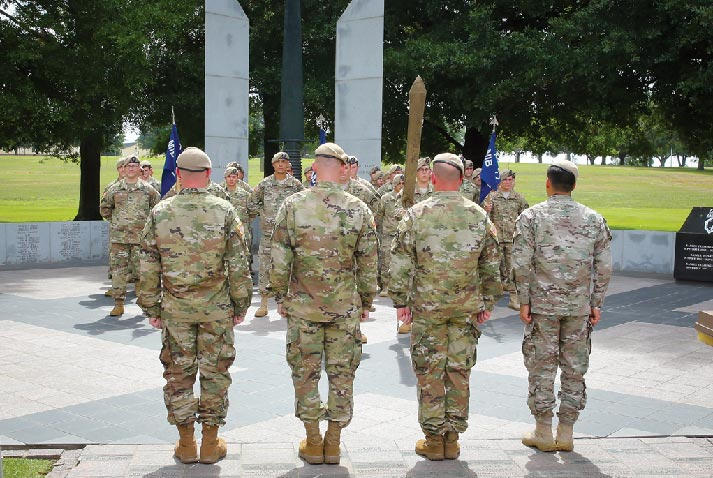
Provisional activation of the battalion, 22 May 2017.

== List of commanders ==
No.	Commander		Term		
No.	Portrait	Name	Took office	Left office	Term length
1	Ryan T. Irwin	Lieutenant Colonel; Ryan T. Irwin	22 May 2017	1 July 2019	~2 years, 40 days
2	Timothy Sikora	Lieutenant Colonel; Timothy Sikora	1 July 2019	10 June 2021	~1 year, 344 days
