= 75th Ranger Regiment =

Elite US Army light infantry unit

- 75th Ranger Regiment's distinctive unit insignia
- Active: 1984–present 1942–present (1st Battalion); 2006–present (Regimental Special Troops Battalion)
- Country: United States of America
- Branch: United States Army
- Type: Light-infantry
- Role: Raiding force Rapid reaction force Special operations force
- Size: 3,623 personnel authorized: 3,566 military personnel; 57 civilian personnel
- Part of: U.S. Army Special Operations Command: United States Special Operations Command; Regimental Reconnaissance Company
- Headquarters: Fort Benning, Georgia
- Nicknames: Army Rangers; Airborne Rangers; Batt Boys
- Mottos: Sua Sponte ("Of their own accord"); Rangers Lead the Way
- Color of Beret: Tan
- Engagements: World War II; Western Front; Operation Rutter; North African campaign; Operation Torch; Italian campaign; Operation Husky; Operation Overlord; Pointe du Hoc; Battle for Brest; Battle of Hürtgen Forest; Philippines campaign; Raid at Cabanatuan; Burma campaign; Cold War; Korean War; Vietnam War; Battle of Signal Hill Vietnam; Iran Hostage Crisis; Operation Eagle Claw; Invasion of Grenada; War on drugs; Invasion of Panama; Gulf War; Somali Civil War; Battle of Mogadishu; Kosovo War; War on terror; Operation Enduring Freedom; Operation Rhino; Operation Anaconda; Iraq War; War in North-West Pakistan; Operation Freedom's Sentinel; Operation Inherent Resolve; Operation Kayla Mueller; Notable operations: Operation Rutter; Operation Torch; Operation Husky; Pointe du Hoc; Raid at Cabanatuan; Battle of Signal Hill Vietnam; Operation Eagle Claw; Operation Gothic Serpent; Operation Enduring Freedom; Operation Rhino; Operation Anaconda; Operation Kayla Mueller
- Website: www.soc.mil/rangers/75thrr.html

Commanders
- Current commander: Colonel Adam Armstrong
- Command Sergeant Major: Command Sergeant Major Chris Masters

Insignia
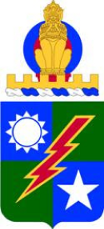
- Regimental coat of arms

- NATO Map Symbol (1998)

- NATO Map Symbol (2017)

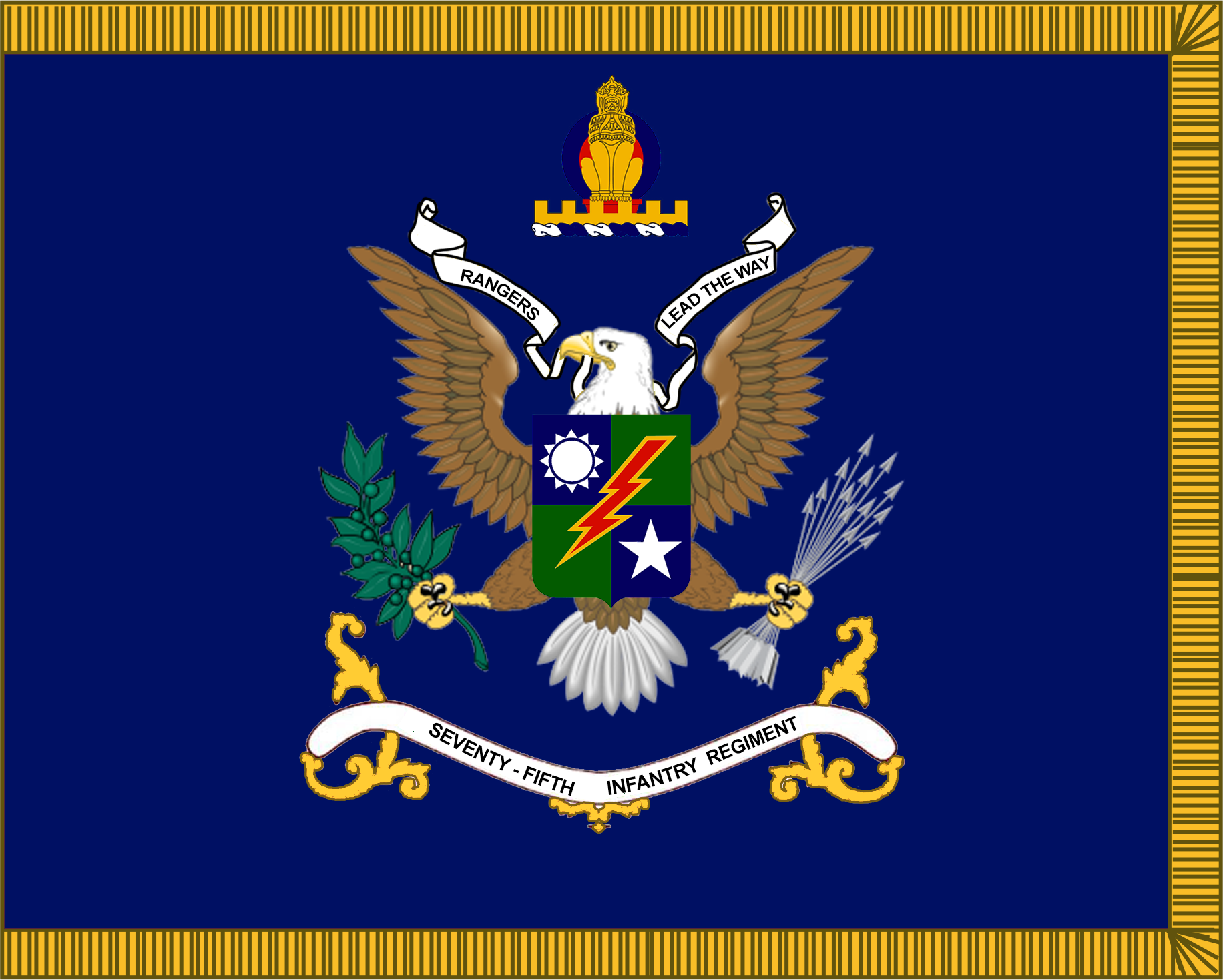
- 75th Ranger Regiment Flag

- Ranger Beret with 75th Ranger Regiment Beret Flash (2001-present)

- Former Ranger Beret with 75th Ranger Regiment Beret Flash (1975-2001)

The 75th Ranger Regiment, also known as the Rangers, is the United States Army Special Operations Command's premier light-infantry and special operations force. The regiment is headquartered at Fort Benning, Georgia, and comprises a regimental headquarters company, a military intelligence battalion, a special troops battalion, and three Ranger battalions.

The 75th Ranger Regiment primarily handles direct-action raids in hostile or sensitive environments, often killing or capturing high-value targets. Other missions include airfield seizure, special reconnaissance, personnel recovery, clandestine insertion, and site exploitation. The regiment can deploy one Ranger battalion within 18 hours of alert notification. The regiment's subunit the Regimental Reconnaissance Company is part of Joint Special Operations Command.

The 75th Ranger Regiment is one of the U.S. military's most extensively used units. On 17 December 2020, it marked 7,000 consecutive days of combat operations.

== History ==
=== Origin ===
American Ranger history predates the American Revolutionary War. Captain Benjamin Church formed Church's Rangers, which fought hostile Native American tribes during King Philip's War (1675–1678). In 1756, Robert Rogers recruited nine Ranger companies to fight in the French and Indian War. They were known as "Rogers' Rangers". The 75th Regiment's history dates back to these rifle companies organized by Rogers, which made long-range attacks against French forces and their native allies, and were instrumental in capturing Fort Detroit.

During the American Revolutionary War, Rogers served as a Loyalist officer on the side of the Crown and many of his former Rangers served on both sides. One, John Stark, commanded the 1st New Hampshire Regiment, which gained fame at the Battles of Bunker Hill and Bennington. Ethan Allen and his Green Mountain Boys in Vermont were also designated as a ranger unit. In 1775, the Continental Congress later formed eight companies of expert riflemen to fight in the Revolutionary War. In 1777, this force commanded by Daniel Morgan, was known as The Corps of Rangers. Francis Marion, "The Swamp Fox", organized another famous Revolutionary War Ranger element known as "Marion's Partisans". Perhaps the most famous Ranger unit in the Revolutionary War was Butler's Rangers, from upstate New York.

During the War of 1812, companies of United States Rangers were raised from among the frontier settlers as part of the regular army. Throughout the war, they patrolled the frontier from Ohio to Western Illinois on horseback and by boat. Rangers participated in many skirmishes and battles with the British and their American Indian allies. Various military Ranger units such as the United States Mounted Rangers, United States Rangers, Loudoun Rangers, 43rd Virginia Rangers, and Texas Military Rangers continued until the modern formation of the Army Ranger Battalions in World War II.

=== World War II battalions ===
==== 1st Ranger Battalion ====
Soon after the United States entered World War II in 1941, General George C. Marshall, Chief of Staff of the United States Army, envisioned an elite unit of fifty men selected voluntarily from the 34th Infantry Division. To create and lead this new unit, Marshall picked Major William Orlando Darby, who was serving as General Russell P. Hartle's aide in Belfast, Northern Ireland, where he was frustrated with his lack of hands-on experience. On 8 June 1942, Darby—now known as the founder of the modern Rangers—was put in charge of the 1st Ranger Battalion under General Hartle.

On 19 August 1942, fifty Rangers fought alongside Canadian and British Commandos in the ill-fated Dieppe Raid on the coast of occupied France. Three Rangers were killed and several were captured. The first American soldier killed in Europe in World War II, Ranger Lieutenant E. V. Loustalot, was part of this raid. During the mission, Loustalot took command after the British captain leading the assault was killed. While attempting to reach a machine gun nest at the top of a cliff, he was wounded three times by enemy fire and killed.

In November 1942, the entire 1st Ranger Battalion entered combat for the first time when they landed at Arzew, French Algeria during Operation Torch. The 1st were split into two groups in hopes of assaulting Vichy-French batteries and fortifications before the 1st Infantry Division would land on the beach. The operation was successful, and the unit sustained minimal casualties.

On 11 February 1943, the Rangers moved 32 miles (51 km) to raid an Italian encampment at Sened Station. Moving at night, the Rangers slipped to within 50 yards (46 m) of the Italian outpost and began their attack. It took the battalion only 20 minutes to overtake the garrison and achieve their objective. Seventy-five Italians were killed and eleven were taken prisoner. Darby, along with four other officers and nine enlisted, was awarded the Silver Star Medal for this action. The battalion itself gained the nickname the "Black Death" by the Italians.

At the time, the Italians still held the pass at Djebel El Ank, located at the far east edge of El Guettar. The Rangers linked up with engineers elements of the 26th Infantry, 1st Infantry Division, to attack the area in preparation for the Battle of El Guettar. The 1st Rangers orders were to move overland, on foot 12 miles (19 km) to outflank the enemy's position. In eight hours of fighting, the Americans captured the objective; the 1st Rangers took 200 prisoners.

==== Creation of 3rd and 4th Ranger Battalions ====
With the success of the 1st Ranger Battalion during the Tunisian campaign, Darby requested that the Rangers be expanded to a full Regiment. The request was granted. The 3rd and 4th Ranger Battalions were authorized shortly after and were trained and led by veteran officers and NCOs from the 1st Battalion. After getting the "green light" to expand, Darby ran into a problem: the Rangers only took volunteers. Darby, knowing that the best man for the job was not always a volunteer, sought out men around Oran. Although he was still limited in that he could only accept volunteers, he began to find ways around this. For instance, he began to give speeches, put up posters, and encourage his officers to scout around for eligible candidates. By June 1943, the three Ranger battalions were fully operational. 1st Rangers were still under Colonel Darby; the 3rd Rangers under Major Herman Dammer, and the 4th Rangers commanded by Major Roy Murray.

1st and 4th Ranger Battalions were paired together and placed with General Terry Allen's 1st Division to spearhead the American landings of the Sicily campaign. Landing outside Gela, the Rangers took the town just after midnight, starting off the Battle of Gela. They held Gela, enduring 50 hours of constant attack by enemy artillery, tank, and air forces.

Following their success, the two Ranger battalions were then ordered to take the town of Butera, a fortress suspended on the 1,319-foot (402 m) high edge of the cliff at Butera beach. After almost withdrawing from the battle, and requesting artillery to level the city, a platoon of Rangers volunteered to breach its defenses. Two privates, John See and John Constantine, snuck in behind enemy lines and tricked the Italians and Germans into surrendering the city.

Meanwhile, the 3rd Ranger Battalion headed out into the area of Agrigento, where they marched through Campobello, Naro, and Favara, successfully occupying each town. The 3rd then took the town of Porto Empedocle.

Colonel Darby was awarded the Distinguished Service Cross and was promoted by General George Patton; however, Darby, wanting to be closer to his men, turned down this promotion.

==== Fall of 1st, 3rd and 4th Battalions ====
After a break for Christmas 1943, the Rangers were put together for a joint effort to occupy the town of Cisterna before the main infantry division moved in. On the night of 30 January 1944, the 1st and 3rd battalions moved into the town, passing many German soldiers who did not appear to notice the Rangers slip by. The 4th Ranger Battalion, which approached the town from the opposite end, met opposition almost immediately on the road. During the night, the 1st and 3rd Ranger battalions separated by about 2 miles (3.2 km), and when daylight caught the 1st Ranger Battalion out in an open field, the Germans began their ambush. Surrounded and unable to escape, the two Ranger battalions fought on until they exhausted their ammunition and resources. The 4th Ranger Battalion pushed to save their comrades but were forced to withdraw. After five hours of fighting, the Rangers surrendered to the German armor and mechanized infantry. The two battalions sustained 12 killed, 36 wounded, and 743 captured—only eight were able to escape. The 4th Battalion suffered 30 killed and 58 wounded.

This marked the end of the three Ranger battalions. The remaining 400 Rangers were scattered around the 504th Parachute Infantry Regiment, and the 137 original Rangers were sent home. 1st and 3rd Battalions were disbanded on 15 August 1944, while 4th Battalion was disbanded on 24 October 1944, at Camp Butner, North Carolina.

==== 2nd and 5th Ranger Battalions ====
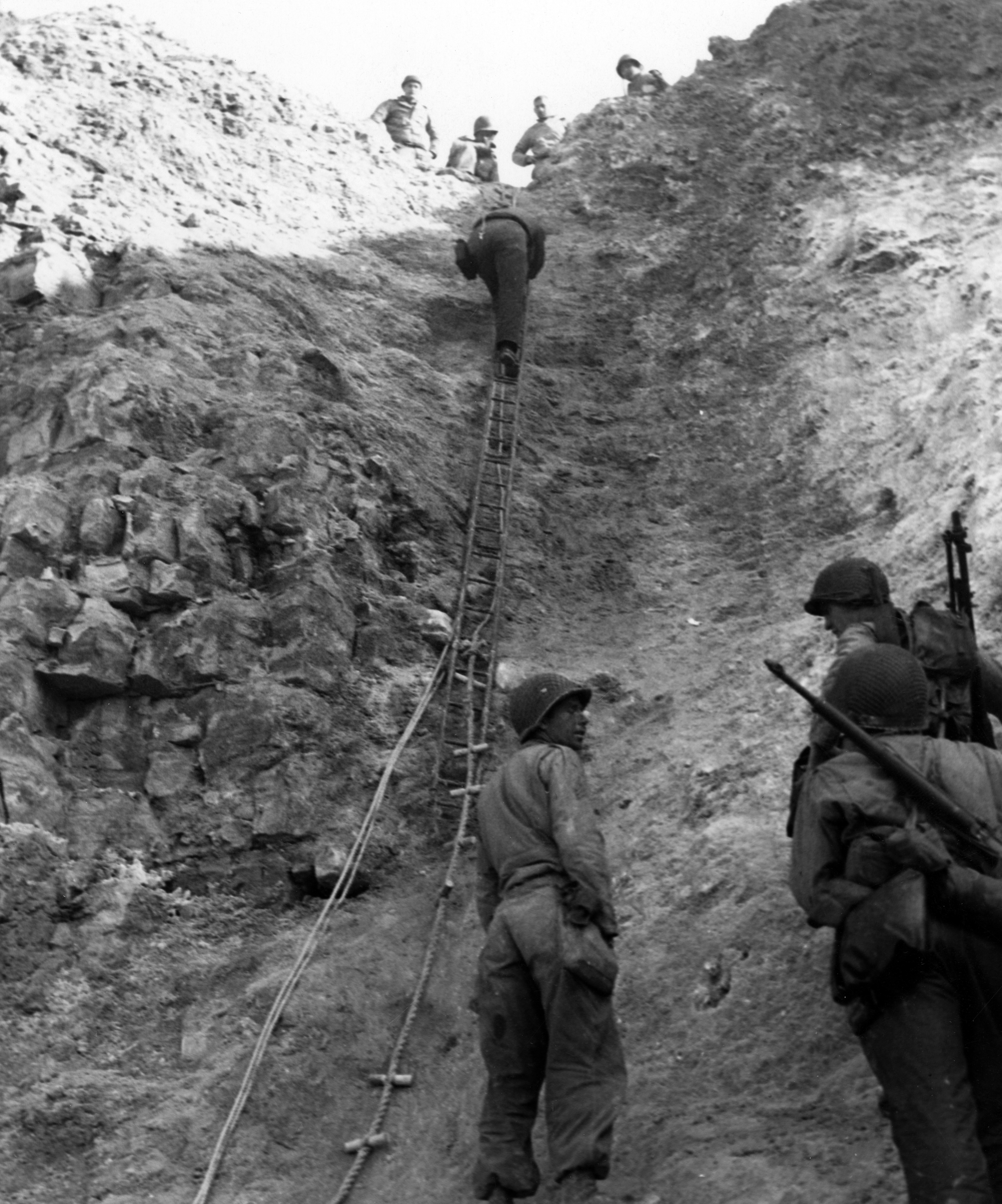
2nd Ranger Battalion troops use rope ladders to scale Pointe du Hoc.

The 2nd Ranger Battalion and 5th Ranger Battalion were trained at Camp Forrest, Tennessee, on 1 April 1943. They first saw action 6 June 1944, during Operation Overlord. During D-day 2nd Rangers companies D, E, and F, were ordered to take a strategic German outpost at Pointe du Hoc. This coastal cliff was supposed to have several 155 mm artillery guns aimed down at the beach. Once they arrived at the bottom of the cliff, they had an enormous climb to make up rope ladders while receiving a barrage of machinegun fire from the Germans above. The 2nd Rangers took the area even with the intense German resistance but the guns were not in sight. A patrol scouting the area found the 155 mm coastal guns a mile away; the patrol party quickly disabled the guns and resistance in the area. In an interview, Leonard Lomell and Jack Kuhn explained the events that took place that day:

"The guns had to have been taken off the Pointe. We were looking for any kind of evidence we could find and it looked like there were some markings on the secondary road where it joined the main road. We decided to leapfrog. Jack covered me, and I went forward. When I got a few feet forward, I covered him. It was a sunken road with very high hedgerows with trees and bushes and stuff like that. It was wide enough to put a column of tanks in, and they would be well hidden. We didn't see anybody, so we just took a chance, running as fast as we could, looking over the hedgerow. At least we had the protection of the high hedgerows. When it became my turn to look over, I said, "God, here they are!" They were in an orchard, camouflaged in among the trees."

Meanwhile, the rest of the 2nd and 5th Ranger Battalions spearheaded the attack on the beach at Omaha. An apocryphal story tells of when General Norman Cota, leading the 29th Infantry Division, met with Major Max F. Schneider, commanding the 5th Ranger Battalion. When Schneider was asked his unit by Cota, someone yelled out "5th Rangers!", to which Cota replied, "Well then Goddammit, Rangers, lead the way!" This drive cut the German line allowing the conventional army to move in. The phrase "Rangers lead the way" later became the motto of the regiment. The 2nd and 5th Ranger Battalions worked on special operation tasks in the Normandy Campaign. The two battalions fought in many battles such as Battle for Brest and the Battle of the Hurtgen Forest. The 2nd Rangers were responsible for capturing Le Conquet Peninsula, where they disabled a 280 mm gun and took many German prisoners. The 2nd Ranger Battalion also went on to take several tactical German positions, cutting the German line in the Rhineland. In Saar west of Zerf, the 5th Battalion took an overlooking German position cutting of all supply routes to German forces.

==== 6th Ranger Battalion ====
The 6th Ranger Battalion was stationed in the Pacific, and served mostly in the Philippines and New Guinea. All operations completed by the 6th Battalion were done in company- or platoon-size behind enemy lines. They were the first soldiers to hit the Philippines, three days before the army would launch the first invasion. The 6th Ranger Battalion conducted long-range reconnaissance, operating miles past the front line.

At Cabanatuan, on the island of Luzon in January 1945, a company of the 6th Ranger Battalion executed the Raid at Cabanatuan. The Rangers penetrated 22–24 miles (35–39 km) behind enemy lines, including crawling a mile (1 mile (1.6 km)) across an open field on their stomachs. During their final assault the Rangers destroyed a garrison of Japanese soldiers twice their size and rescued 500 POWs.

The 6th Ranger Battalion's final mission was to secure a drop zone for 11th Airborne Division paratroopers 250 miles (400 km) into enemy territory. They linked up with the 37th Infantry Division and ended the war in the Philippines.

=== Merrill's Marauders ===
Marauders badge

In August 1944, after five months of fighting in China Burma India Theater with the Japanese Army, Merrill's Marauders (5307th Composite Unit (Provisional)) were consolidated into then 475th Infantry, afterwards the 75th Infantry Regiment. As a special force group led by Brigadier General Frank Merrill, to commemorate its companion Chinese Expeditionary Force (Burma), Merrill's Marauders put the sun from the National emblem of the Republic of China and the Star from Burma's flag on its badge. The lightning bolt signifies the swiftness of their strikes. Merrill's Marauders would later become part of the regiment's lineage.

=== Korean War ===
The outbreak of hostilities in Korea in June 1950 again signaled the need for Rangers. Fifteen Ranger companies were formed during the Korean War, drawing their lineages from the World War II era Ranger battalions. The Rangers went to battle throughout the winter of 1950 and the spring of 1951. They were nomadic warriors, attached first to one Regiment and then to another. They performed "out front" work—scouting, patrolling, raids, ambushes, spearheading assaults, and as counterattack forces to regain lost positions. In all six airborne Ranger companies, the 1st, 2nd, 3rd, 4th, 5th, and 8th, averaging 125 soldiers in each company served during the conflict. Two other companies, the 10th and 11th, were scheduled for Korea but were deactivated in Japan. During the course of the Korean War, 100 Rangers were killed in action and 296 were wounded in action.

=== Vietnam War ===
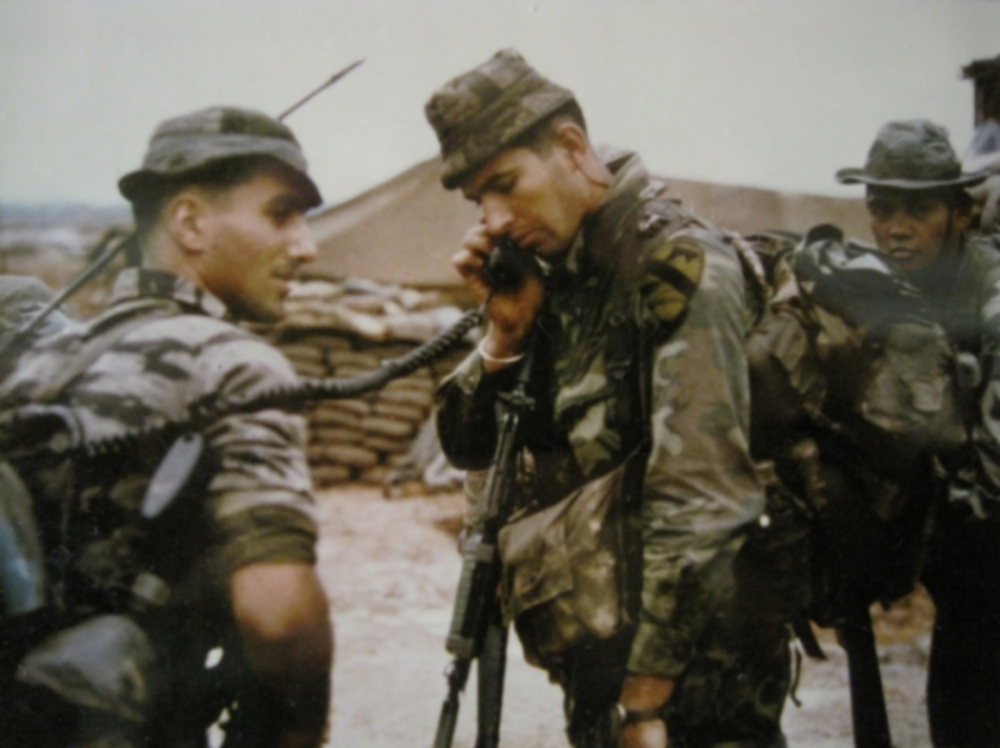
1st Cavalry Rangers making communications checks prior to patrol on 12 February 1968.

The history of Long Range Reconnaissance Patrol (LRRP—pronounced "Lurp"), LRP, and Ranger units deployed during the Cold War in Europe and South Vietnam is based on three time periods: 1) LRRP from late 1965 to 20 December 1967; 2) LRP from late December 1967 through January 1969; and 3) Ranger from 1 February 1969, to 1972 when the Vietnam War drew down and the U.S. Vietnam Ranger units were deactivated. Despite sharing a similar name, these Ranger units under the 75th Infantry Regiment (Ranger) drew their lineages not from the World War II/Korean War era Ranger battalions but from 5307 Composite Unit, also known as Merrill's Marauders. In 1974, their colors and lineage were passed to newly formed Ranger Battalions based in the United States.

The first period above began in Vietnam in November 1966 with the creation of a provisional LRRP Detachment by the 1st Cavalry Division (Airmobile); followed by the 1st Brigade, 101st Airborne Division; the 1st Infantry Division; and the 25th Infantry Division in June 1966. General William C. Westmoreland, commander of Military Assistance Command, Vietnam (MACV), ordered the creation of provisional LRRPs in all Infantry brigades and divisions on 8 July 1966. By the winter of 1966 the 4th and 9th Infantry Divisions had operational LRRP units, and in January 1967 the 196th Light Infantry Brigade had the same. The 101st Airborne Division "main body," while still at Fort Campbell, Kentucky, converted its divisional Recondo School into a provisional LRRP unit in the summer of 1967, before the division deployed to Vietnam. This provisional company arrived in Vietnam in late November 1967.

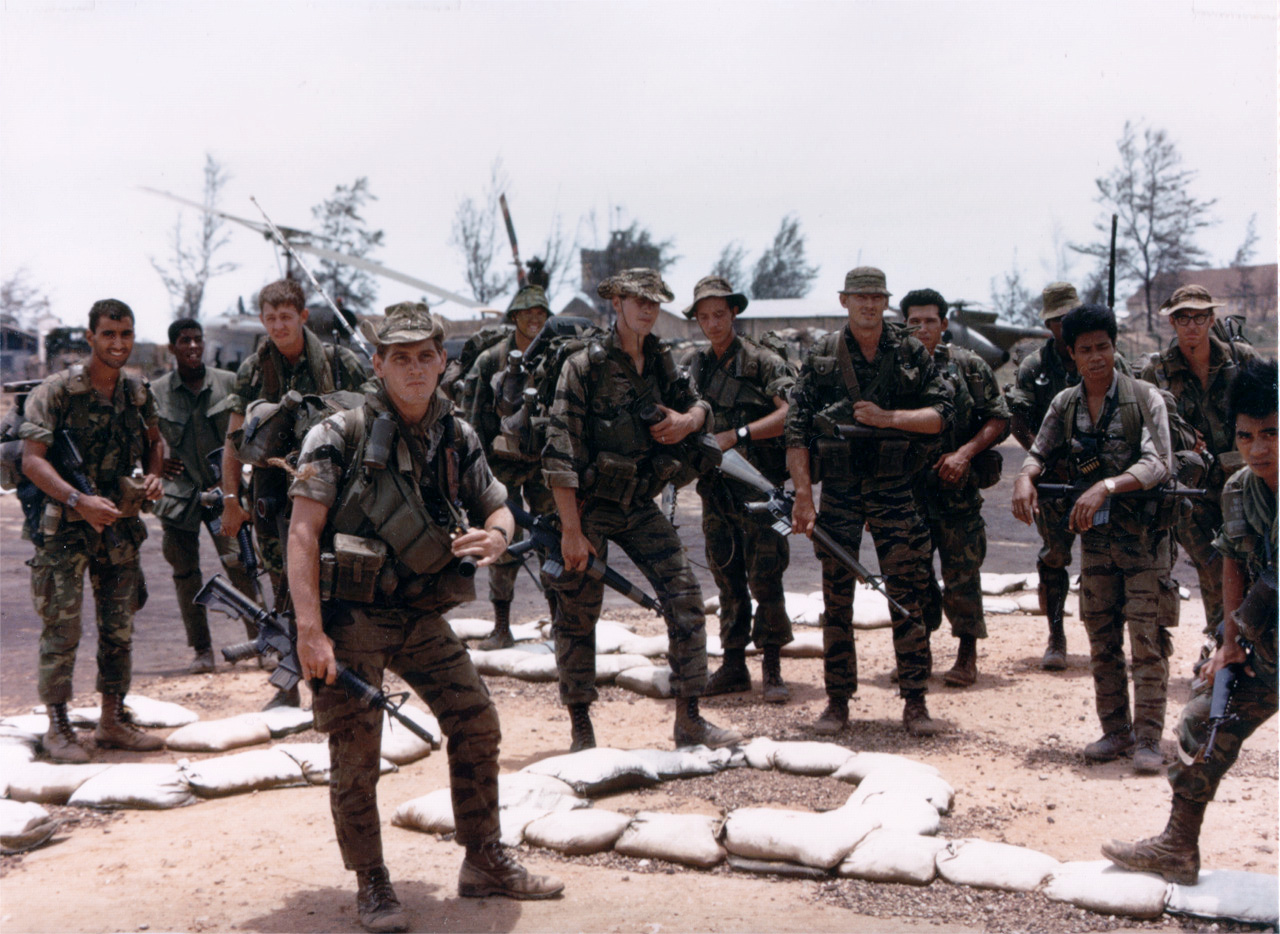
Two 1st Cav LRP Ranger teams in Quang Tri, Vietnam, 26 July 1968.

The second period began in late June 1967, when the chairman of the Joint Chiefs of Staff, General Earle G. Wheeler, authorized the formation of two long-range patrol companies for I and II Field Forces. Company E (Long Range Reconnaissance Patrol), 20th Infantry (Airborne) was activated on 25 September 1967, and assigned to I Field Force and stationed at Phan Rang. The nucleus of this unit came from the 1st Brigade, 101st Airborne Division LRRP Platoon, along with soldiers from the replacement stream. Company F (Long Range Patrol), 51st Infantry (Airborne) was activated on 25 September 1967, and assigned to II Field Force stationed at Bien Hoa. Its nucleus came from the LRRP platoon of the 173d Airborne Brigade, along with soldiers from the replacement stream. Each of the two Field Force LRP companies had a strength of 230 men, and was commanded by a major. In an apparent response to division commanders' tactical requirements, and bolstered by the combat effectiveness of the provisional LRRP units, in the winter of 1967 the Army authorized separate company designations for Long Range Patrol (LRP) units in divisions and detachments in separate brigades. The divisional LRP companies were authorized 118 men and the brigade detachments 61 men. The wholesale renaming of existing divisional LRP units occurred on 20 December 1967, in the 1st Cavalry, 1st Infantry, 4th Infantry, 9th Infantry, 23d (Americal), and 25th Infantry Divisions. LRP detachments were created in the 199th Light Infantry Brigade on 10 January 1968, in the 173d Airborne Brigade on 5 February 1968, and in the 3d Brigade 82d Airborne Division and 1st Brigade 5th Mechanized Division on 15 December 1968.

On 1 February 1969, the final period of the existence of these units began when the Department of the Army redesignated the LRP companies and detachments as lettered Ranger companies of the 75th Infantry Regiment under the Combined Arms Regimental System (CARS). The "re-flagged" Ranger companies were: "A" V Corps Rangers, Fort Hood, Texas; "B" VII Corps Rangers, Fort Lewis, Washington; "C" I Field Forces, Vietnam; "D" II Field Forces, Vietnam; "E" 9th Infantry Division, Vietnam; F 25th Infantry Division, Vietnam; "G" 23rd Infantry Division, Vietnam; "H" 1st Cavalry Division, Vietnam; "I" 1st Infantry Division, Vietnam; "K" 4th Infantry Division, Vietnam; "L" 101st Airborne Division, Vietnam; "M" 199th Light Infantry Brigade, Vietnam; "N" 173rd Airborne Brigade, Vietnam; "O" 3rd Brigade, 82nd Airborne Division, Vietnam; "P" 1st Brigade, 5th Infantry Division (Mechanized), Vietnam; "D/151" Indiana National Guard; and "F/425 " Michigan National Guard. The third period ended when the Ranger companies were inactivated as their parent units were withdrawn from the war between November 1969 (starting with Company O, 3rd Brigade, 82nd Airborne Division) to 15 August 1972 (ending with Company H, 1st Cavalry Division). On 9 June 1972, H Company (Ranger) lost SGT Elvis Weldon Osborne Jr. and CPL Jeffrey Alan Maurer to enemy action. Three other US soldiers were killed by non-hostile action that day, but SGT Osborne and CPL Maurer were the last US Army infantrymen killed on the ground, as well as the last Rangers killed in the Vietnam War.

=== Post-Vietnam War ===
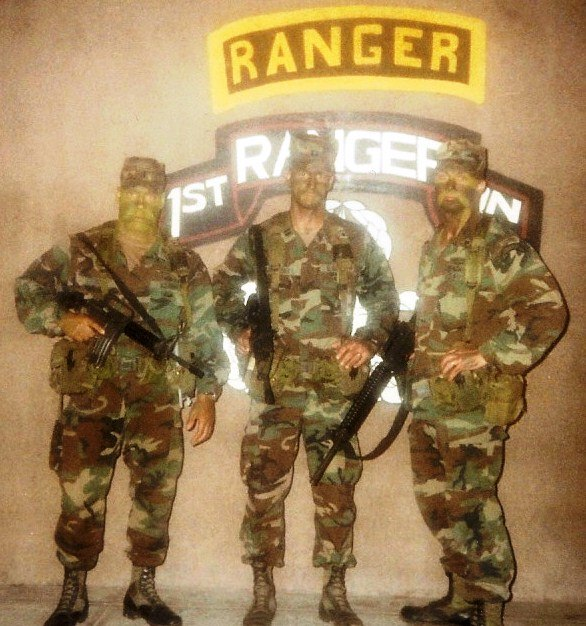
Rangers from 1/75 during a training exercise 1989–1990 1LT Joe Yorio, CPT Jeff Jarkowsky and SSG Paul Johnson.

In January 1974, General Creighton Abrams, Army Chief of Staff, directed the formation of a Ranger battalion. General Kenneth C. Leuer was charged with activating, organizing, training and leading the first battalion sized Ranger unit since World War II. Though the Vietnam War era Ranger companies of the 75th Infantry Regiment (Ranger), which drew their lineages from Merrill's Marauders, had all been deactivated (or soon would be), they passed their lineages and colors to these new battalions. The 1st Battalion, which carried its legacy from Merrill's Marauders via Company C, 75th Infantry Regiment (Ranger) was activated and parachuted into Fort Stewart, Georgia, on 1 July 1974. The 2nd Battalion, which drew lineage from Company H, 75th Infantry (Ranger), followed shortly afterward with activation at Fort Lewis, Washington on 1 October 1974. The 3rd Battalion and Headquarters Company were activated and received their colors on 3 October 1984, from Company F, 75th Infantry Regiment (Ranger) at Fort Benning, Georgia. On 3 February 1986, the 1st, 2nd, and 3rd Battalions of the 75th were consolidated with active and inactive units which carried the lineages of the World War II era: 1st, 2nd, 3rd, 4th, 5th, and 6th Ranger Battalions. The regiment as a whole was concurrently redesignated as the 75th Ranger Regiment.

The modern Ranger battalions were first called upon in 1980 when elements of 1st Ranger Battalion participated in Operation Eagle Claw, the Iranian hostage-rescue mission. In October 1983, 1st and 2nd Ranger Battalions spearheaded Operation Urgent Fury, conducting a dangerous low-level parachute assault to seize Point Salines Airfield and rescue American citizens at True Blue Medical Campus in Grenada.

The entire 75th Ranger Regiment participated in Operation Just Cause, which lasted from December 1989 to January 1990. Rangers spearheaded the action by conducting two important operations. Simultaneous parachute assaults were conducted onto Torrijos/Tocumen International Airport, Rio Hato Airfield, and General Manuel Noriega's beach house to neutralize Panamanian Defense Forces. The Rangers captured more than 1,014 prisoners of war and more than 18,000 weapons.

Elements of Company B, and 1st Platoon Company A, 1st Ranger Battalion, deployed to Saudi Arabia from 12 February 1991, to 15 April 1991, for Operation Desert Storm. They conducted raids and provided a quick reaction force in cooperation with allied forces. In December 1991, 1/75 and the Regimental headquarters deployed to Kuwait in a show of force called Operation Iris Gold. The Rangers performed an airborne assault onto Ali Al Salem airfield, near Kuwait City, conducted a 50 km (31 mi) foot march through devastation (including mine fields) left from the ground campaign, conducted a live fire exercise, and left on foot.

In August 1993, elements of 3rd Ranger Battalion deployed to Somalia as "Task Force Ranger", part of Operation GOTHIC SERPENT designed to help United Nations forces attempting to bring order to the chaotic and starving nation. On 3 October 1993, the Rangers conducted a daylight raid with Delta Force. They captured the high-value targets but the ensuing Battle of Mogadishu ended in chaos as the American forces were trapped for hours inside the city by Somalian militias, due to a series of planning and command errors, resulting in the death of 18 American soldiers. Rangers held improvised positions for nearly 18 hours, killing between 500 and 1,000 Somalis before American QRF, Pakistani, and Malaysian troops with armor rescued them and the American troops could retreat. The mission was seen as a pyrrhic victory

=== Regimental Reconnaissance Company ===
In 1984, the 75th Ranger Regiment established a Regimental Reconnaissance Detachment (RRD). On 24 November 2000, the detachment deployed with a command-and-control element to Kosovo for Task Force Falcon. By 2005, the unit—enlarged and renamed the Regimental Reconnaissance Company (RRC)—had become an elite special operations force and a member of Joint Special Operations Command. In 2006, the Regimental Reconnaissance Company was moved into the new Regimental Special Troops Battalion.

=== Regimental Special Troops Battalion ===
Several years into the war on terror, the 75th Ranger Regiment created a Regimental Special Troops Battalion (RSTB) to help switch from short-term "contingency missions" to continuous combat operations. Activated on 17 July 2006, the RSTB conducts sustainment, intelligence, reconnaissance and maintenance missions that were previously accomplished by small detachments assigned to the Regimental Headquarters and then attached within each of the three Ranger battalions. The battalion consists of the Ranger Reconnaissance Company, the Ranger Communications Company (RCC), the Ranger Military Intelligence Company (RMIC), and the Ranger Selection and Training Company (RST&C). The RSTB draws its lineage from Company N, 75th Infantry Regiment (back to Merrill's Marauders) and Company B, 1st Ranger Infantry Battalion.

=== Global war on terrorism ===
While the Ranger Regiment has traditionally been considered an elite light infantry force, its operations in Afghanistan and Iraq from 2001 to 2012 demonstrated its ability to conduct a full range of special operations missions.

In October 2007, a D Company was added to each of the three battalions of the 75th Ranger Regiment.

By 2012, the 75th Ranger Regiment was conducting sustained combat operations in multiple countries, deploying from multiple locations in the United States—an unprecedented task for the regiment. Rangers conducted combat operations with almost every deployed special operations, conventional, and coalition force in Operation Enduring Freedom and Operation Iraqi Freedom. The Ranger Regiment executed a wide range of operations, including airborne and air assaults into Afghanistan and Iraq, mounted infiltrations behind enemy lines, complex urban raids on high-value targets (HVTs), and rescue operations. Ranger battalion operational tempo while deployed was high. During one Afghanistan deployment, the 1st Ranger Battalion conducted more than 900 missions, captured nearly 1,700 enemy combatants (including 386 high-value targets), and killed more than 400 fighters.

By mid-2015 each Ranger battalion had completed its twentieth deployment to Afghanistan and Iraq.

Army Times reported that in December 2016, the first female officer completed RASP, making the 75th Ranger Regiment the first special operations unit to have a female soldier graduate its selection course.

==== Operation Enduring Freedom – Afghanistan ====
After the events of September 11, 2001, Rangers were called into action for the war on terror. On 19 October 2001, 200 Rangers of 3rd Battalion, 75th Ranger Regiment spearheaded ground forces by conducting an airborne assault to seize Objective Rhino during the 2001 invasion of Afghanistan, the opening battle of Operation Enduring Freedom – Afghanistan. Spc. Jonn J. Edmunds and Pfc. Kristofer T. Stonesifer became the first combat casualties in the war on terror when their MH-60L helicopter crashed at Objective Honda in Pakistan, a temporary staging site used by a company of Rangers from 3rd Battalion. Ranger protection force teams were part of Task Force Sword, a black SOF unit whose primary objective was capturing or killing senior leaders and HVTs with al-Qaeda and the Taliban. A squadron of Delta Force operatives, supported by Rangers from TF Sword, conducted an operation outside Kandahar at a location known as Objective Gecko; they missed the mission's target but killed some 30 Taliban fighters in a heavy firefight.

In November 2001, the 75th Ranger Regiment carried out its second combat parachute drop into Afghanistan: a platoon-sized Ranger security element, including the Regimental Reconnaissance Detachment Team 3 conducted the missions: Objective Wolverine, Raptor and Operation Relentless Strike. During the Battle of Tora Bora in December 2001, a CIA Jawbreaker team (a small group of CIA SAD ground branch operators) requested that the 3rd Battalion, 75th Ranger Regiment be inserted into the mountains to block escape routes from Tora Bora to Pakistan. They would serve as an "anvil" while Special Forces with the Afghan Militia Forces would be the "hammer". With the attached Air Force Combat Controllers, the Rangers could have directed airstrikes onto enemy concentrations or engaged them in ambushes, but their requests to do so were denied.

In March 2002, 35 Rangers from 1st Battalion, 75th Ranger Regiment had been assigned as QRF for all Task Force operations, but only half of the platoon was available for the Battle of Takur Ghar. In the final days of Operation Anaconda, a mixed force of Rangers travelling in Blackhawk helicopters backed up operators from DEVGRU who intercepted a convoy of al-Qaeda fighters traveling in three SUVs via three MH-47Es. A firefight left 16 al-Qaeda fighters dead and two seriously wounded and captured. On 18 August, Rangers and other coalition special forces joined the 82nd Airborne Division in Operation Mountain Sweep, carrying out five combat air assault missions in the area around the villages of Dormat and Narizah, south of Khowst and Gardez. The force found an anti-aircraft gun, two 82mm mortars, recoilless rifles, rocket-propelled-grenade launchers, machine guns, small arms and ammunition for all of them; they also detained 10 people. Later in 2002, TF 11 was replaced by a small JSOC element manned by SEALs and Rangers.

In 2003, after Khalid Sheikh Mohammed was arrested in a joint CIA-ISI operation in Pakistan, Rangers and 82nd Airborne Division troops helped transport him to a U.S. black site prison. After the troops secured an improvised desert strip in a dry river bed near the Pakistani border, an MC-130 Combat Talon plane landed and lowered its ramp, whereupon SEALs from DEVGRU drove Desert Patrol Vehicles carrying the detainee up the ramp into the back of the plane, which taxied and lifted off.

In summer 2005, during Operation Red Wings, a Ranger patrol retrieved HM2 Marcus Luttrell five days after he went missing.

In July 2006, in Helmand Province, two MH-47Es from 160th SOAR attempted to insert a combined strike element of DEVGRU, Rangers, and Afghan commandos so they could attack a compound. With some troops on the ground, a large insurgent force ambushed them; both helicopters were struck by small arms fire. One MH-47E pilot put his aircraft in the line of fire to protect the assault team disembarking from the other MH-47E, but was struck by an RPG and crash-landed without serious injury. The Ranger commander and an attached Australian commando organized an all-round defense while the other MH-47E held back the advancing insurgents until its Miniguns ran out of ammunition. An AC-130 Spectre joined the battle and kept the downed crew and passengers safe until a British Immediate Response Team helicopter recovered them. The AC-130 then destroyed the MH-47E wreck, denying it to the Taliban. Also that year, a six-man RRD (Regimental Reconnaissance Detachment) team from the 75th Ranger Regiment attached to the JSOC Task Force inserted into the Hindu Kush mountain range after intelligence indicated that an insurgent chief, Haqqani, would be entering Afghanistan from Pakistan. After establishing an OP almost 4,000 meters above sea level, the RRD team waited and watched for their target. Insurgents arrived and began to fire on the Ranger team, whose attached JTAC called in an orbiting B-1B strategic bomber. The airplane killed an estimated 100 insurgents, but not Haqqani.

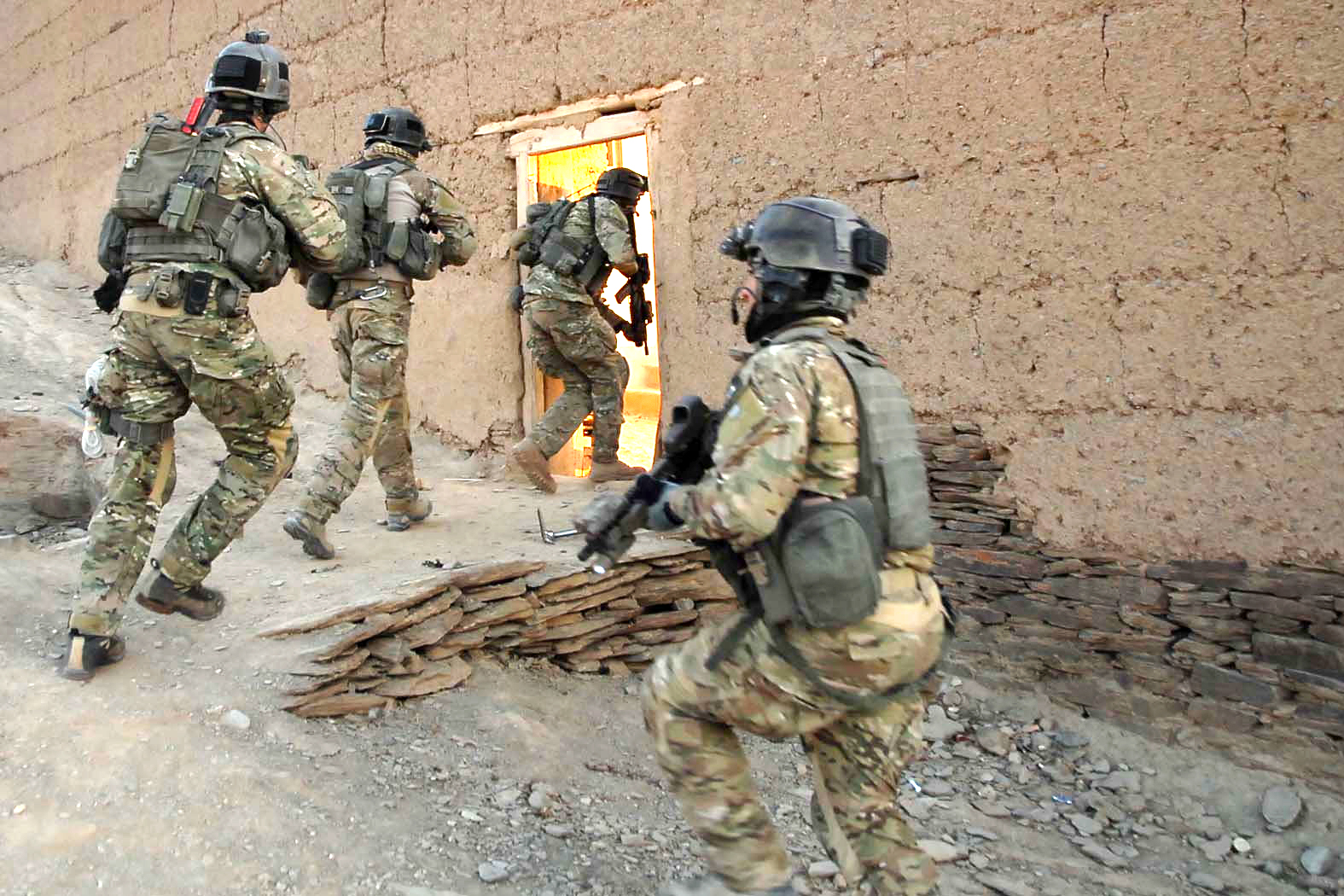
A Ranger assault team assaults a compound in Nerkh district in Wardak province, Afghanistan, on November 19, 2009.

In 2007, after a CIA source reported seeing Bin Laden in Tora Bora, many theater ISR assets were sent the area. The initial plan based around a small helicopter assault force soon expanded to include Special Forces ODAs and a Ranger element to provide a cordon for the SEALs. Eventually, the operation was launched under the cover of Air Force bombing, but after fruitless searching through the mountains, no sign of Bin Laden was found.

In June 2009, Army soldier Bowe Bergdahl was captured by the Taliban. Over the five years that he was held by the Taliban and Haqqani Network, Rangers and DEVGRU "spun up" operations to rescue him, but each resulted in a "dry hole."

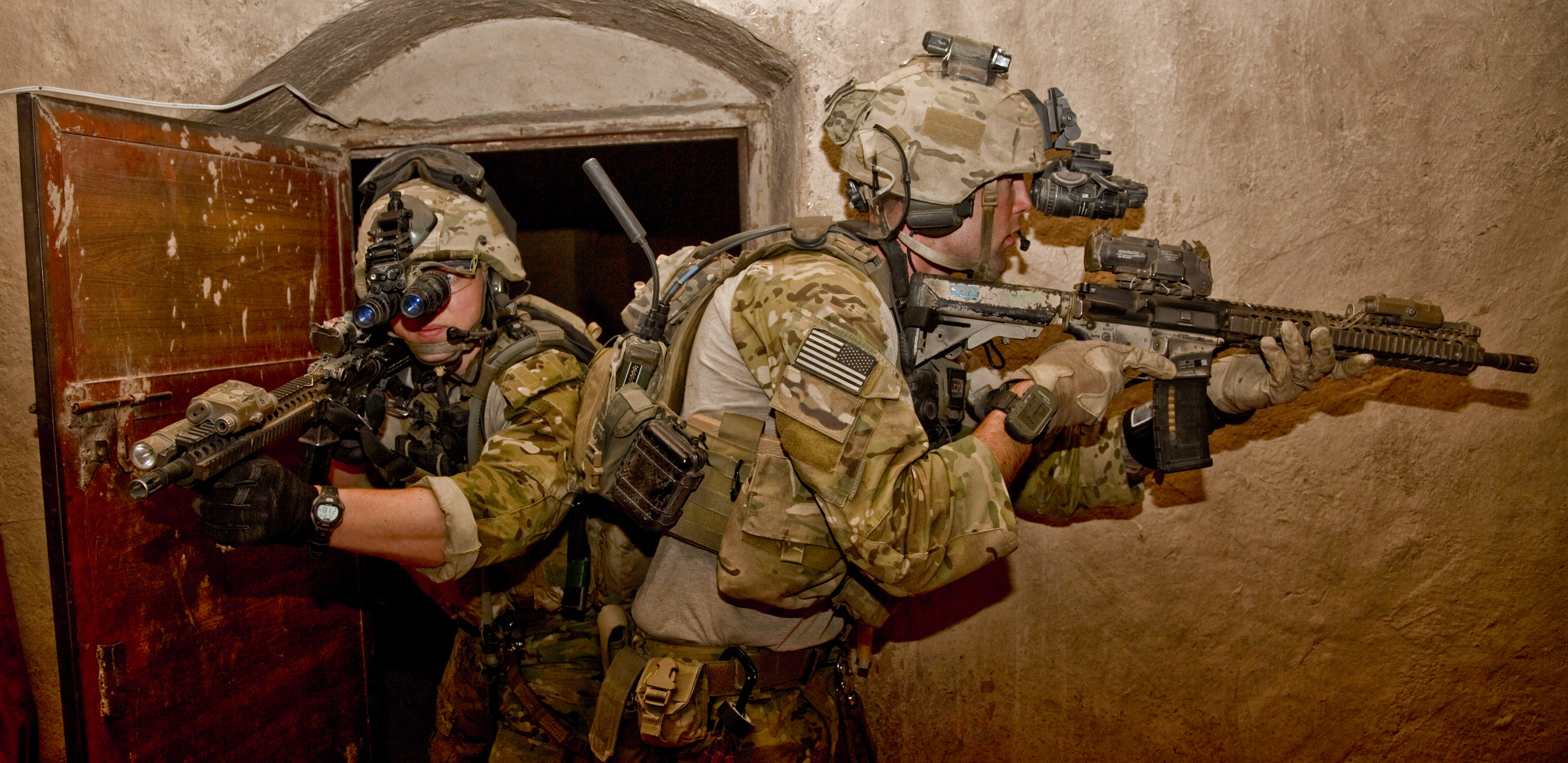
Rangers armed with M4A1 carbines in SOPMOD Block II clear a room during a night raid in Helmand Province, Afghanistan, on August 26, 2012.

On 8 October 2010, a troop from DEVGRU and two squads of Rangers tried to rescue Linda Norgrove, who was being held by the Taliban in compounds in the Korangal Valley. The rescue mission failed when a DEVGRU operator accidentally killed Norgrove with a grenade.

For actions between 14 and 16 November 2010, Charlie Company 1/75th, received the Valorous Unit Award for extraordinary heroism, combat achievement, and conspicuous gallantry.

With ISAF's surge in Afghanistan at its peak in summer 2011, 1/75th (and Bravo Company in particular) received the Meritorious Unit Citation for actions during Operation Enduring Freedom between 15 May – 28 August 2011. These included conducting continuous combat operations, including time-sensitive raids and deliberate movement-to-contact operations in enemy-held terrain beyond reach of friendly forces in places like Khost, Paktika and Nangarhar Province. Two Rangers from the battalion were killed during this time. On 20 July, Delta Force supported by Rangers and Afghan SOF elements were inserted by the 160th SOAR into the mountainous region of Sar Rowzah District, Paktika Province. They were immediately engaged by insurgents who were heavily armed with DShK HMGs and RPGs; during that night's fighting, about 30 insurgents were killed. As the sun rose, dozens of remaining insurgents who had been hiding in bunkers and caves became visible, and armed UAVs, AH-6s, and MH-60 DAPs flew in close air support, as did ground attack aircraft. Fighting continued into a second day as bunkers and fighting positions were systematically cleared, some using then-recently issued Mk14 Antistructural Grenades. An estimated 80 to 100 Haqqani and foreign fighters were killed in the two-day battle.

On 6 August, a platoon of U.S. Army Rangers began taking fire while trying to capture a senior Taliban leader in the Tangi Valley in Wardak province. A CH-47 helicopter carrying 38 American and Afghan servicemen was dispatched to help, but was shot down by the Taliban. All 38 aboard died in the deadliest single incident for Americans in the Afghanistan campaign.

==== Operation Iraqi Freedom ====
During the 2003 invasion of Iraq, all three Ranger Battalions were assigned to a new Task Force whose goals were to seize key locations, conduct long-range special reconnaissance, and capture HVTs. On 24 March 2003, 3rd Battalion 75th Ranger Regiment conducted a combat drop onto H-1 Air Base, securing the site as a staging area for operations in western Iraq. A company of Rangers and Royal Marines from 45 Commando flew into Iraq from Jordan to secure H-2 and H-3 airbases after they were captured by US, British and Australian SOF. On 26 March, B Company, 2/75th supported DEVGRU operators in the Objective Beaver raid on a suspected chemical and biological weapons site north of Haditha; they engaged numerous gunmen but found no chemical or biological weapons. On 1 April 2003, 290 Rangers from 1/75th and 2/75th helped rescue Private 1st Class Jessica Lynch; also that day, Delta Force and 3/75th captured the Haditha Dam and held it for five days.

After the invasion, the main 75th Ranger element deployed to Iraq carried out operations in northern Iraq and was based out of Mosul or Tikrit, supported by a small element of Delta Force operators. The DEVGRU squadron were supported by a reinforced Ranger platoon as was the Delta Force squadron, all part of the overall effort by JSOC in Iraq. On 18 June 2003, Delta Force operators and Rangers flew from Mosul via helicopter to chase a vehicle convoy of Ba'ath Party Iraqis who were fleeing over the border into Syria; JSOC suspected that Saddam Hussein was part of the convoy so the convoy was destroyed by an AC-130 Spectre. The operators then conducted a heliborne assault into a nearby compound that proved to be a Ba'athist safe house for ferrying former regime elements across the border. The operators came under fire from Syrian border guards, leading to a firefight that left several Syrians dead and 17 captured. Hussein was not in the convoy, but several of his cousins were.

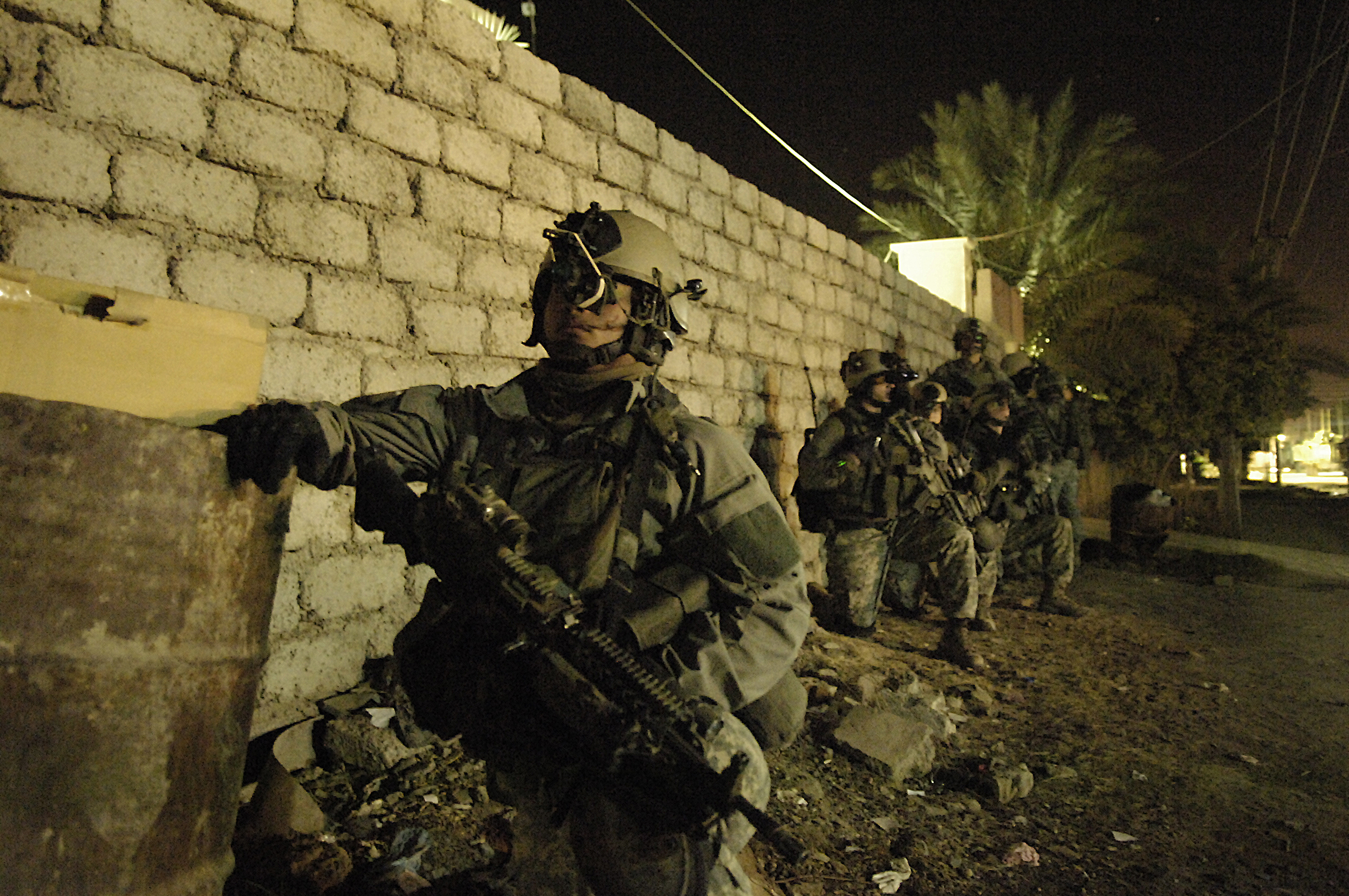
Rangers conduct a security halt in Iraq, 26 April 2007.

On 23 July 2005, in Baghdad, Rangers acted as a back-up force for the British Special Boat Service during Operation Marlborough.

On 1 January 2006, Rangers raided a remote farmhouse outside Baghdad, capturing several gunmen without a fight and rescuing British freelance journalist Phillip Sands, who had been kidnapped a week earlier.

In Ramadi, the Rangers switched to riskier daylight raids after insurgents learned to move out of the city at night.

In November 2006, a new secret directive sanctioned by President Bush allowed U.S. forces in Iraq to kill or capture Iranian nationals if they were targeting coalition forces. The directive reflected Hezbollah's success in the 2006 Lebanon War and Iran's defiance on its nuclear issue; the new mission was known by its acronym CII (Counter Iranian Influence). The CII missions were given to Task Force 17, a new command based around the headquarters of an Army Special Forces group. To support TF 17, Rangers from B Company 2/75th flew into Sadr City to hunt a Shia Special Groups leader, leading to a fierce street battle; the Rangers conducted a fighting withdrawal that was likened to "Mogadishu Mile." More than 45 insurgents were killed with no Ranger losses; when the Iraqi government was made aware of the operation, permission to conduct operations in Sadr City was immediately withdrawn, limiting the Task Force's targeting.

In June 2008, Rangers eliminated perhaps their highest-profile target yet: Abu Khalaf, deputy leader of al Qaeda in Iraq. A reinforced platoon of Rangers assaulted the target house, codenamed Objective Crescent Lake. As the Ranger assault element placed their explosive breaching charges, two sentries on the roof of the house armed with AK-47 assault rifles approached them, who were then killed by an attached 4-man sniper team from the Ranger battalion's sniper platoon. The assault element breached the house and methodically cleared each room; in one room, Rangers arrested a man and a woman. When the man reached under his clothing, the Rangers shot him, then the woman as she leapt on his body. The man was found to be wearing a suicide-bomb vest filled with ball bearings. Meanwhile, Khalaf ran to the road with a pistol and was shot dead by the Ranger snipers. The Rangers also discovered a plan for a chemical weapon attack on a coalition base.

By this time, the Rangers had sent an additional platoon to Iraq to help conduct a day-night raiding cycle, and conducted up to 100 missions in one three-month deployment.

After January 2009, the new Status of Forces Agreement (SOFA) required JSOC and Ranger operations to seek Iraqi judicial permission for each mission.

On the night of 18 April 2010, ISOF troops, supported by U.S. troops, raided a terrorist safe house near Tikrit in Iraq, the ISOF killed Abu Ayyub al-Masri and Abu Omar al-Baghdadi, the two leaders of ISI; 16 others were also arrested. A US UH-60 Blackhawk helicopter supporting the mission crashed, killing a Ranger NCO from 3/75th and wounding the aircrew.

==== War in North-West Pakistan ====
In March 2006, DEVGRU operators and a Ranger element are alleged to have attacked an al-Qaeda training camp in North Waziristan in Pakistan. In an operation reportedly named Operation Vigilant Harvest, they were flown across the Afghan-Pakistani border and killed as many as 30 terrorists, including the Chechen camp commandant Imam Asad. The operation has been credited to the Pakistani Special Service Group.

On 1 May 2011, a Ranger element was assigned to support Operation Neptune Spear, aimed at killing or capturing Osama bin Laden. The Ranger element and additional SEALs in MH-47E Chinooks served as QRF; the Ranger element would also protect the FARP north of Abbottabad. Following the successful completion of the operation, a Ranger team transported Bin Laden's body to the aircraft carrier USS Carl Vinson for burial at sea.

==== Operation Freedom's Sentinel ====
In November 2015, the U.S. military sent a company of Rangers to southeastern Afghanistan, as part of the post-ISAF phase of the war in Afghanistan, to help Afghan counter-terrorism forces destroy an al-Qaeda training camp in a "fierce fight" that lasted for several days.

On the evening of 26 April 2017, 50 Rangers from 3/75th joined 40 Afghan commandos in a joint US-Afghan raid on the headquarters of Abdul Hasib, the emir of ISIS-K, in a village in Achin District, Nangarhar Province. The force was flown into Mohmand Valley and within minutes were engaged in a heavy, close-quarter firefight with ISIL-KP militants. AC-130 gunships, Apache helicopters, F-16 fighters, and drones were called in. In the 3-hour firefight, two Rangers died (one each from C and D Companies, possibly from friendly fire) and one was wounded, while 35 ISIL-KP militants (including Abdul Hasib and an unspecified number of ISIL-KP leaders) were killed.

==== Operation Inherent Resolve ====
In March 2017, as part of Operation Inherent Resolve, CNN reported that about 100 Rangers in Strykers and armored Humvees deployed in and around Manbij, Syria, to protect the 11th MEU, which was providing artillery and other support to U.S.-backed forces in the battle to liberate Raqqa from ISIL, rather than the typical mission of training, advising and assisting local forces. U.S. officials took the unusual step of publicly talking about the Ranger deployment and where they are located to protect against them inadvertently coming under fire from forces fighting in the region or Turkish, Russian, or Syrian government forces.

==== Regiment Military Intelligence Battalion (RMIB) ====
On 22 May 2017, the Ranger Regiment Military Intelligence Battalion was established to specialize in intelligence, surveillance, reconnaissance, cyber, and electronic warfare operations. Based at Fort Benning, it consists of the Military Intelligence Company (MICO), Cyber Electro Magnetic Activities company (CEMA), and Headquarters and Headquarters Company (HHC). It draws its lineage from Company P, 75th Infantry (back to Merrill's Marauders) and Company B, 2nd Ranger Infantry Battalion.

==== Operation Kayla Mueller ====
On 26 October 2019, the Rangers, Delta Force, and the 160th SOAR killed ISIL leader Abu Bakr al-Baghdadi.

75th Ranger Regiment
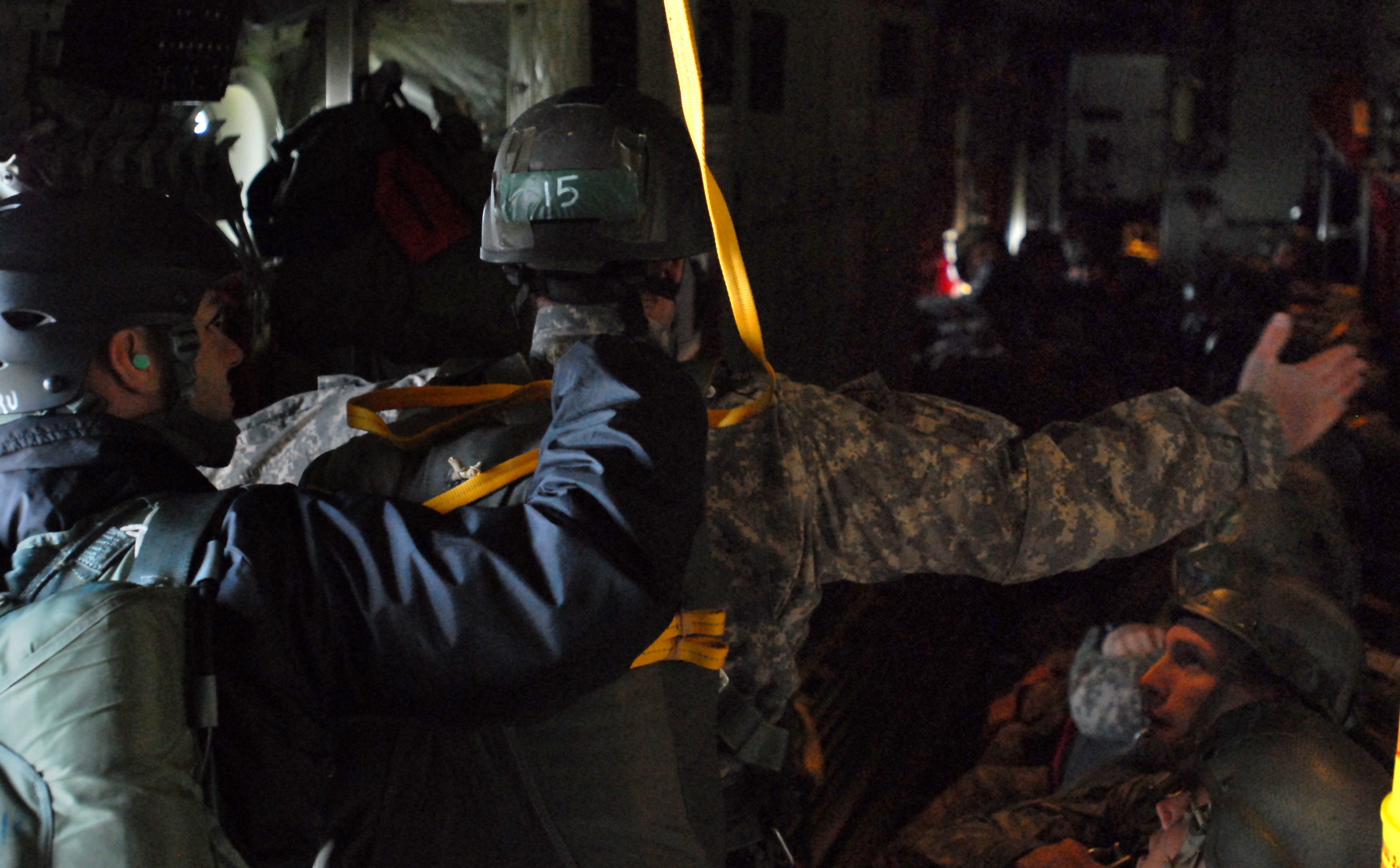
A Ranger from the 2nd Ranger Battalion instructs fellow soldiers in a Jump Master course at Joint Base Lewis-McChord, 13 April 2004

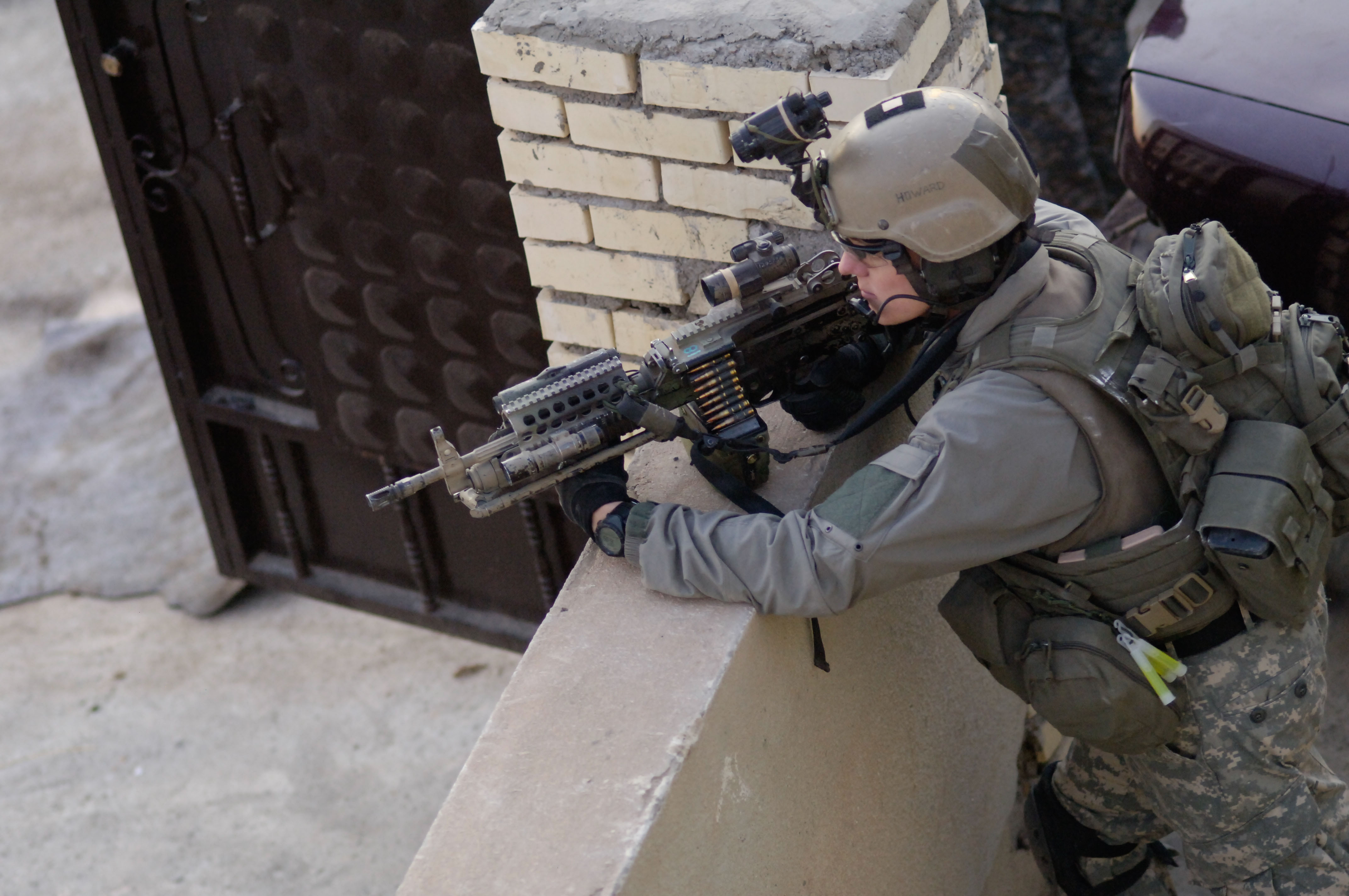
A Ranger from the 2nd Ranger Battalion providing overwatch during combat operations in Iraq, 23 November 2006

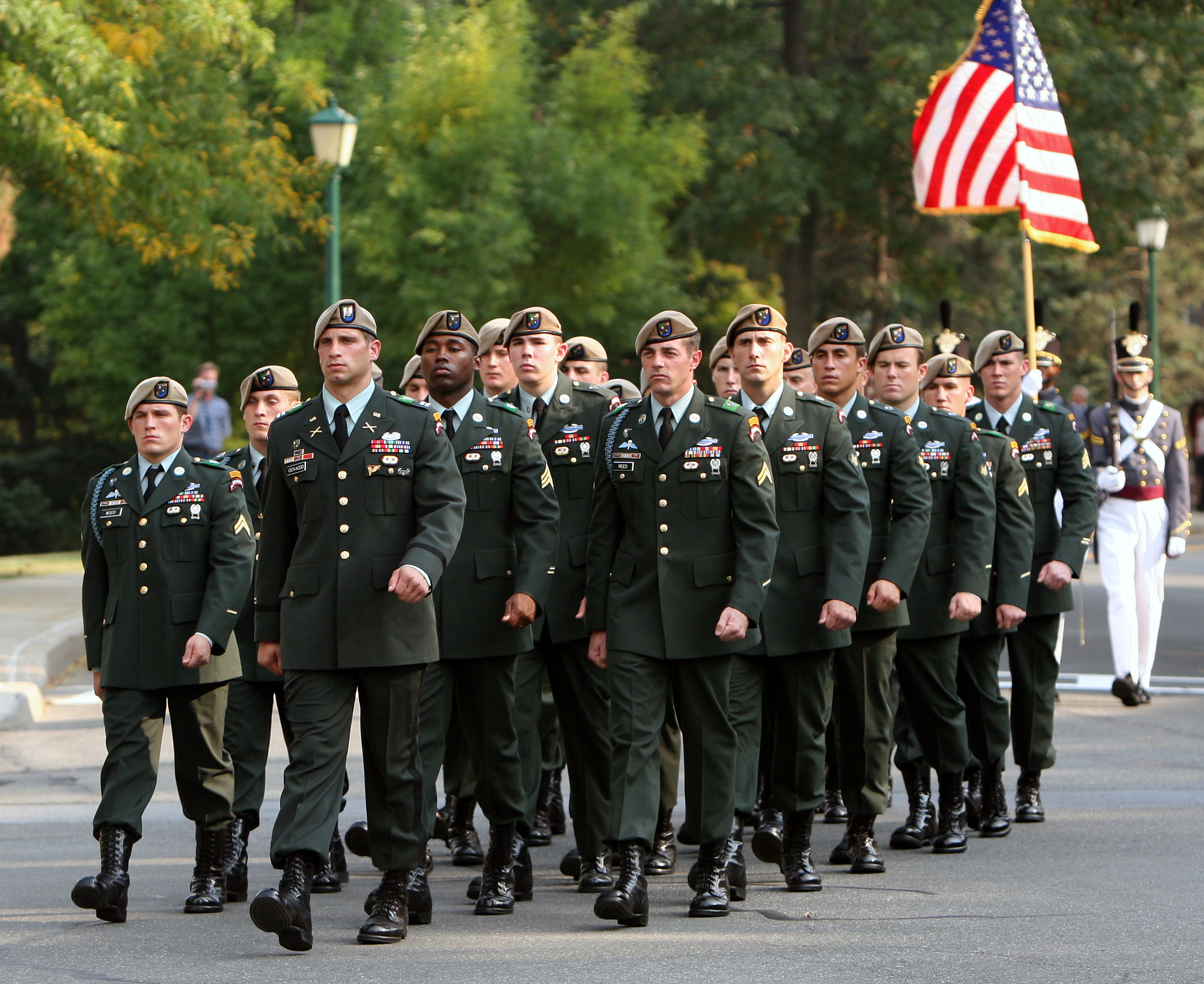
The Ranger honor platoon at the interment ceremony of General Wayne Downing at West Point, New York, 27 September 2007

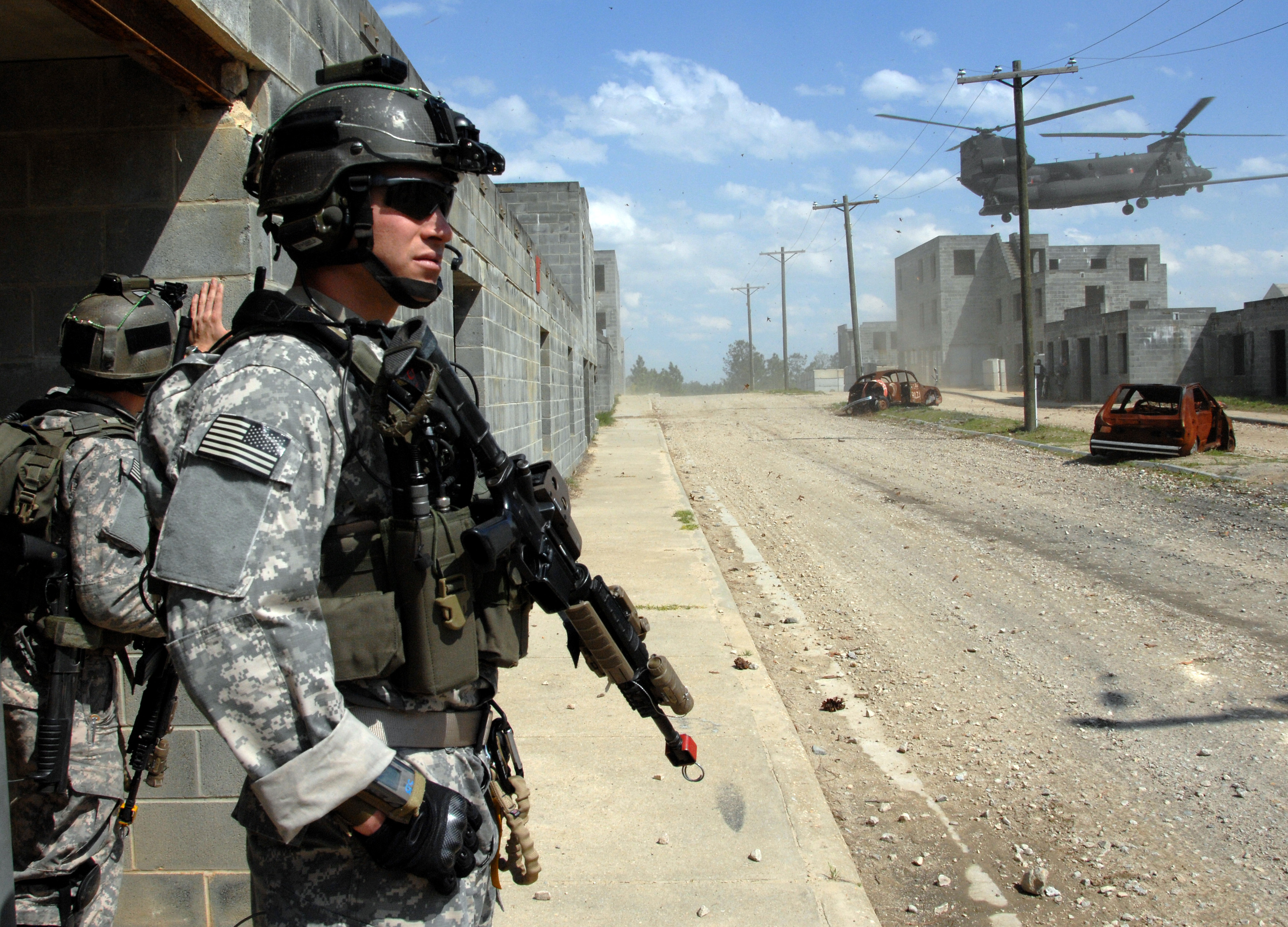
Army Rangers from the 1st Ranger Battalion, conduct a MOUT exercise at Fort Bragg, North Carolina, 21 April 2009

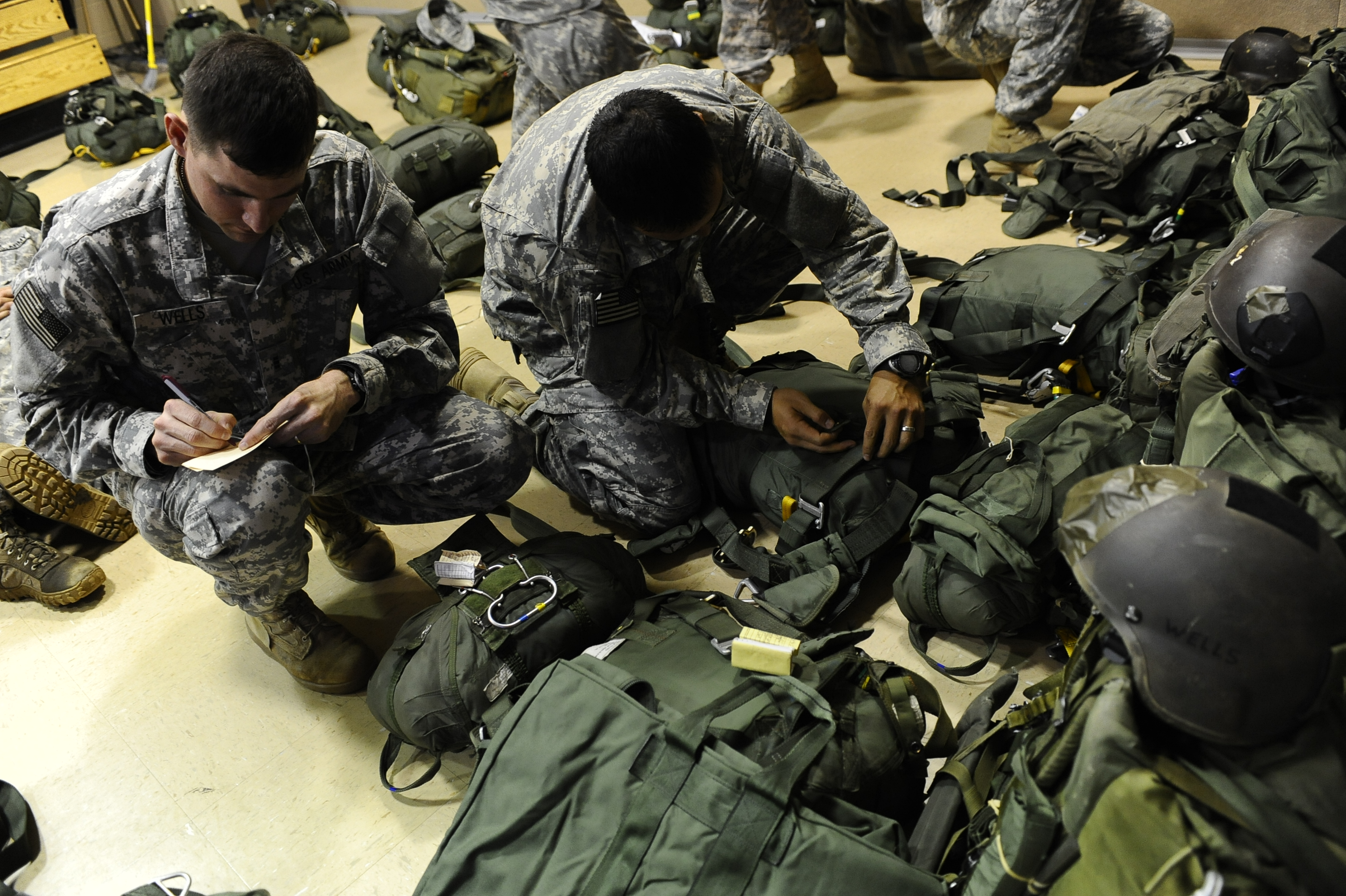
Two Rangers inspect their gear before the Ranger Rendezvous, a mass tactical jump conducted by elements from the entire Regiment, 3 August 2009

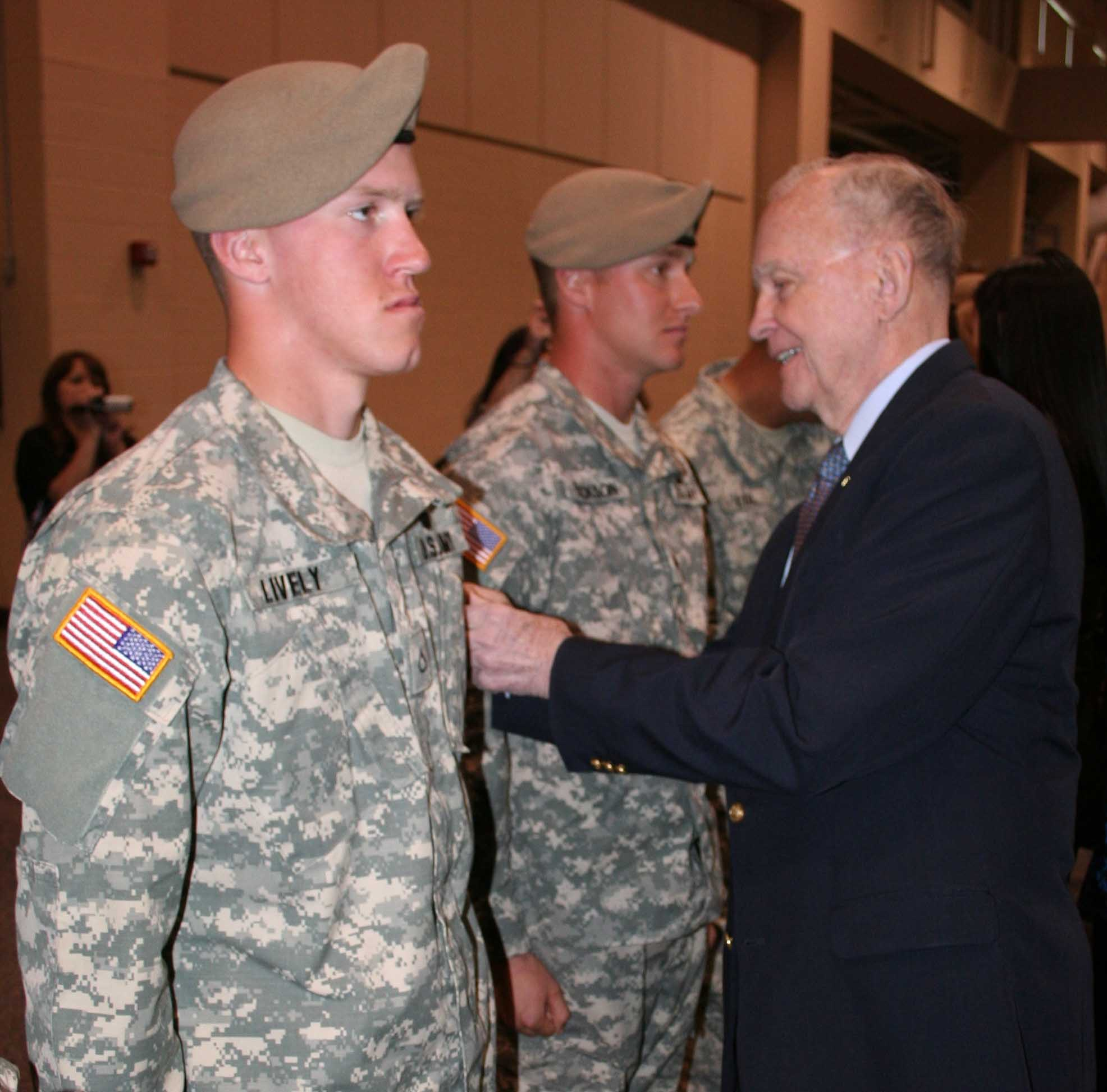
Retired Colonel Ralph Puckett places the Ranger Scroll on two graduates of the Ranger Assessment and Selection Program, 5 January 2010

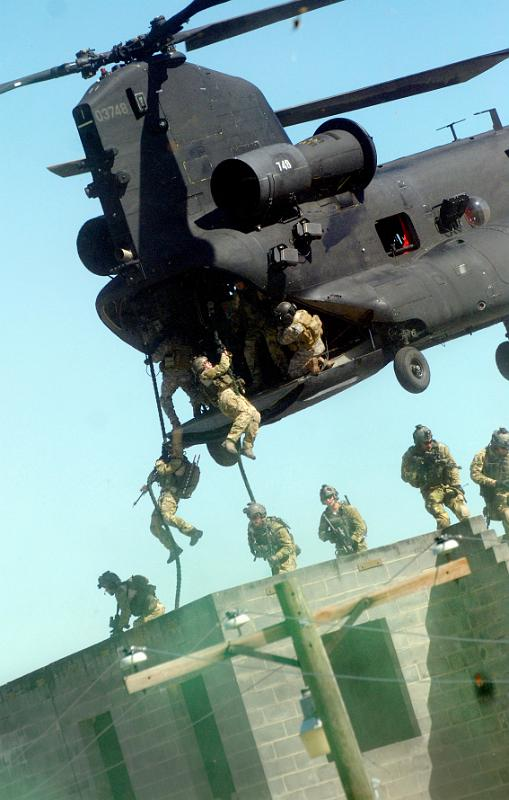
Rangers practice fast roping techniques from an MH-47 during an exercise at Fort Bragg, 28 April 2010

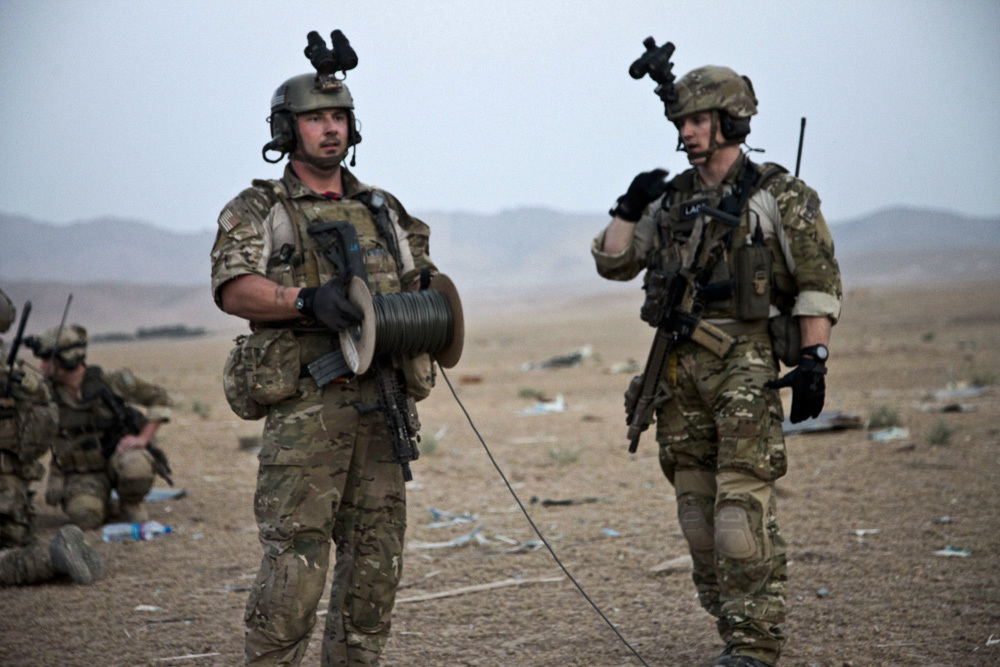
Rangers in Puli Alam District, Afghanistan, 28 August 2012

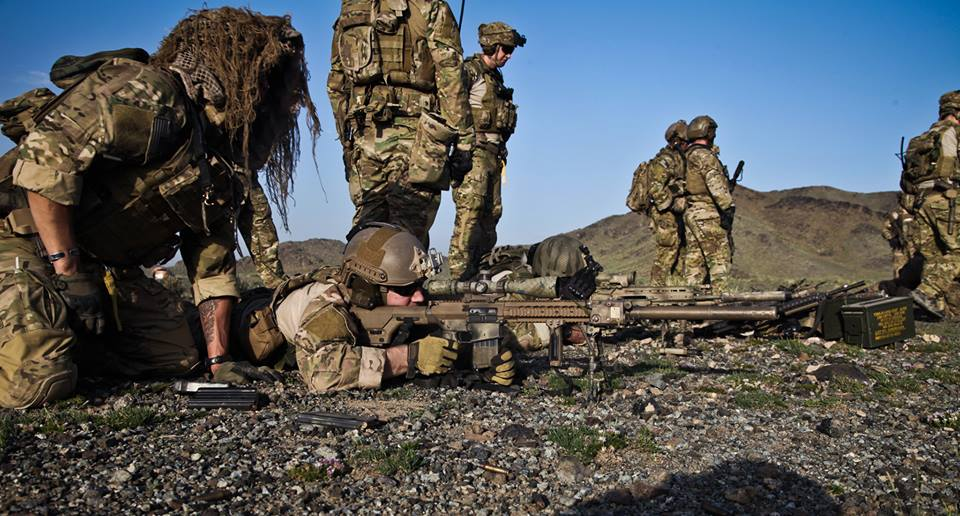
Ranger snipers from 1st Ranger Battalion, practice marksmanship on a range in Afghanistan prior to a night combat operation against insurgents, 7 May 2013

== Organization ==
Unit	Combat Service Identification Badge (a.k.a. Ranger Scroll)	Beret Flash	Location
75th Ranger Regiment Regimental Headquarters and Headquarters Company	75th Ranger Regiment CSIB		Fort Benning, Georgia
Regimental Military Intelligence Battalion: Headquarters and Headquarters Company; Military Intelligence Company; Cyber Electro Magnetic Activities Company	75th Ranger Regiment Military Intelligence Battalion CSIB		Fort Benning, Georgia
Regimental Special Troops Battalion: Headquarters and Headquarters Company; Regimental Reconnaissance Company; Communications Company; Selection and Training Company			Fort Benning, Georgia
Regimental Special Troops Battalion: Headquarters and Headquarters Company; Regimental Reconnaissance Company; Communications Company; Selection and Training Company	75th Ranger Regiment Special Troop Battalion (STB) CSIB		Fort Benning, Georgia
1st Ranger Battalion: Headquarters and Headquarters Company; Alpha Company (Rifle); Bravo Company (Rifle); Charlie Company (Rifle); Delta Company (Specialty); Echo Company (Support)	1st Ranger Battalion CSIB		Hunter Army Airfield, Georgia
2nd Ranger Battalion: Headquarters and Headquarters Company; Alpha Company (Rifle); Bravo Company (Rifle); Charlie Company (Rifle); Delta Company (Specialty); Echo Company (Support)	2nd Ranger Battalion CSIB	Fort Lewis	(Joint Base Lewis-McChord)Washington
3rd Ranger Battalion: Headquarters and Headquarters Company; Alpha Company (Rifle); Bravo Company (Rifle); Charlie Company (Rifle); Delta Company (Specialty); Echo Company (Support)	3rd Ranger Battalion CSIB		Fort Benning, Georgia

== Lineage ==
- Organized as 5307th Composite Unit (Provisional) on 3 October 1943

Consolidated with the 475th Infantry and unit designated as 475th Infantry on 10 August 1944
Inactivated on 1 July 1945

- Redesignated as 75th Infantry on 21 June 1954

Allotted to the Regular Army on 26 October 1954
Activated on 20 November 1954
Inactivated on 21 March 1956

- 75th Infantry Regiment (Ranger) reorganized as a parent regiment under the Combat Arms Regimental System on 1 January 1969

Reorganized with Headquarters on 1 July 1984

- On 3 February 1986, the 75th Infantry Regiment (then consisting of Headquarters and Headquarters Company, 1st Battalion, 2nd Battalion, and 3rd Battalion) was consolidated with the former Company A, 1st Ranger Infantry Battalion (then part of HHC 7th SFG), Company A, 2nd Infantry Battalion (then part of HHC 10th SFG), and the inactive units Company A, 3rd Ranger Infantry Battalion (last part of HHC 13th SFG, inactivated in 1966), 4th Ranger Infantry Battalion, 5th Ranger Infantry Battalion, and 6th Ranger Infantry Battalion; it was concurrently designated as 75th Ranger Regiment and reorganized under the Regimental System.

== Modern Ranger selection and training ==
=== Qualifications ===
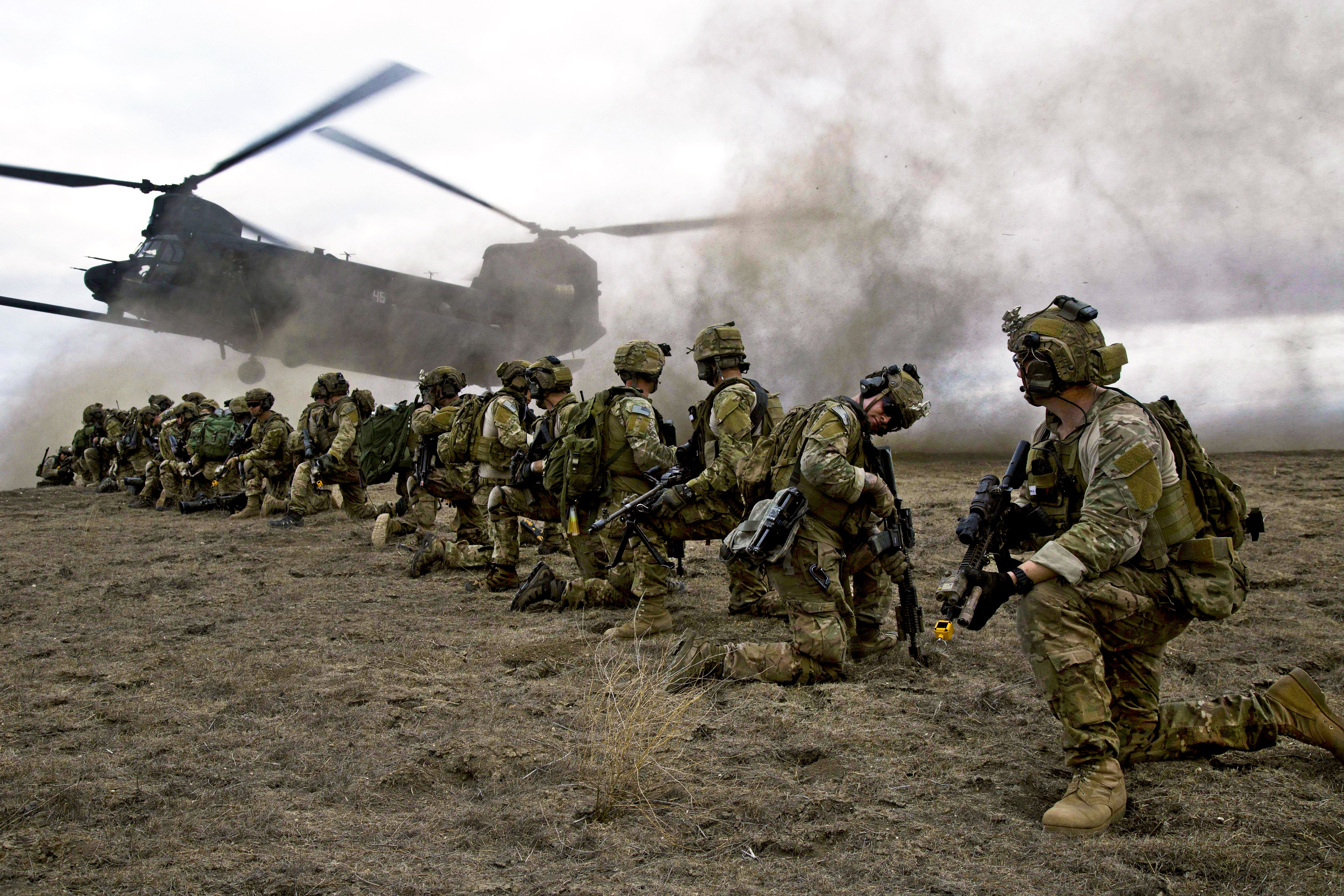
U.S. Army Rangers, assigned to 2nd Battalion, 75th Ranger Regiment, prepare for extraction during Task Force Training at Fort Hunter Liggett, California, January 30, 2014.

- Be a U.S. citizen
- Be on active duty and volunteer for assignment
- Have a General Technical Score of 105 or higher
- No physical limitations (PULHES of 111221 or better)
- Qualify and volunteer for Airborne training
- A person of good character (no pending UCMJ action or drug or alcohol related incidents within 24 months)
- Must enlist into or currently hold a Military Occupational Specialty found in the 75th Ranger Regiment
- Able to attain at minimum a Secret clearance
- Pass physical requirements which include the Ranger Fitness Test (41 hand-release push-ups, 2:30 plank, run 5 miles in 40 minutes or less, 6 chin-ups), Water Survival Assessment, and 12-mile footmarch with a 35lb rucksack and weapon in under 3 hours

Additionally Army officer applicants must:

- Be an officer of grade O-1 through O-4
- Qualify for a Top Secret Security Clearance
- Meet Year Group specific criteria
- Hold an officer Military Occupational Specialty found in the 75th Ranger Regiment.

=== Selection and training ===
Every volunteer for the Regiment, from new recruit to officer and any senior leader selected to command in the Regiment, will go through the Ranger Assessment and Selection Program (RASP) to assess their ability and provide the basic skills required to be an effective member of the 75th Ranger Regiment.

For new soldiers, RASP is conducted after applicants complete their basic Military Occupational Specialty course. After completing RASP, soldiers attend the Army parachutists course (Airborne School). For soldiers, both enlisted and officer, who have completed their first tour of duty and meet the recruiting qualifications, a RASP date will be scheduled upon application and conditional acceptance to the 75th Ranger Regiment.

RASP includes two levels of training: RASP 1 for junior non-commissioned officers and enlisted soldiers (pay grades E-1 through E-5) and RASP 2 for senior non-commissioned officers, officers, and warrant officers. Candidates train in physical fitness, marksmanship, small unit tactics, medical proficiency, and mobility. Training is fast-paced and intense, ensuring Ranger candidates can handle continued training and worldwide operations upon reaching their assigned Ranger unit. Throughout the course, candidates are screened to ensure that only the best soldiers are chosen for the Ranger Regiment. All candidates must meet the course requirements in order to serve in the Ranger Regiment. Upon completion of RASP, candidates will don the tan beret and 75th Ranger Regiment Scroll.

==== RASP 1 ====
Ranger Assessment & Selection Program 1 (RASP 1) is an 8-week selection course for junior non-commissioned officers and enlisted soldiers (pay grades E-1 through E-5) that is broken down into two phases. Ranger candidates endure a grueling test of physical and mental endurance, road marches with rucksacks, land navigation, leadership skills, and weapons training—performed under continuous food and sleep deprivation. Graduates have the advanced skills all Rangers are required to know to start their career with the 75th Ranger Regiment. Phase 1 focuses more on the critical events and skill level 1 tasks and Phase 2 focuses on training in marksmanship, breaching, mobility, and physical fitness.

==== RASP 2 ====
Ranger Assessment & Selection Program 2 (RASP 2) is a 21-day selection course for senior non-commissioned officers, officers, and warrant officers. Candidates' physical and mental capabilities are tested as they learn the special tactics, techniques and procedures of the Regiment, as well as learning the expectations of leading and developing young Rangers...

=== Continued training ===
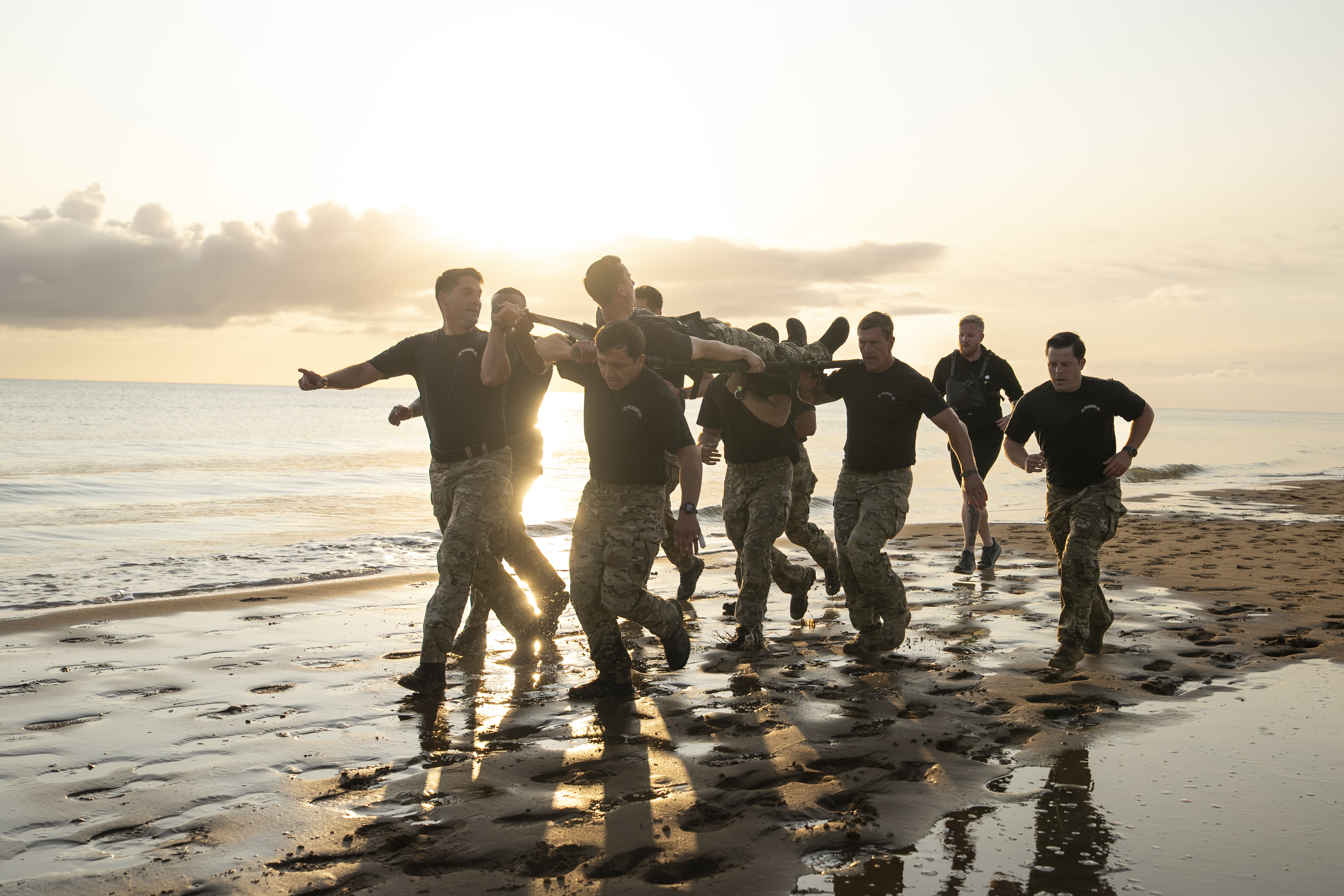
Ranger training at Omaha Beach, France in June 2025

To maintain readiness, Rangers train constantly. Rangers focus on the "Big 5": marksmanship, physical training, medical training, small unit tactics, and mobility.

Throughout their time in the Ranger Regiment, Rangers may attend many types of special schools and training. Depending on occupation and job requirements, members of the 75th Ranger Regiment enjoy unparalleled access to countless military schools, including Jumpmaster, Sniper, Pathfinder, Military Freefall, Scuba, Survival-Evasion-Resistance-Escape (SERE), Special Operations Combat Medic and others. Before serving as a leader in the Regiment, Rangers are also expected to attend and graduate Ranger School. Members of the regiment may also get joint training and non-traditional military and civilian schooling.

Rangers are trained in "do-it-yourself" emergency medicine. Based on the premise that 90% of deaths from wounds are suffered before reaching medical facilities and that there are not enough medics and doctors to go around, the regiment began to train Rangers to give themselves immediate, preliminary treatment. A 2011 study found a 3 percent death rate from potentially survivable causes in the 75th Regiment between October 2001 and April 2010. That compares with a 24 percent rate in a previously reported set of U.S. military deaths in Iraq and Afghanistan, which included troops who didn't have Ranger-style training.

=== RFS/RFM ===
As a U.S. Army Special Operations Command unit, the Rangers maintain more stringent standards for their personnel. If at any point a Ranger is deemed to be failing to meet these standards he may be relieved and removed from the regiment. This is commonly referred to as being RFSed, short for "Released For Standards". A Ranger can be RFS'd for virtually any reason, ranging from lack of motivation to disciplinary problems. Similarly, a Ranger physically incapable of performing his mission through prolonged illness or injury can also be removed from the regiment through a process referred to as RFM or "Relieved For Medical reasons".

== Honors, mottos and creed ==
The 75th Ranger Regiment has been credited with numerous campaigns from World War II onwards. In World War II, they participated in 16 major campaigns, spearheading the campaigns in Morocco, Sicily, Naples-Foggia, Anzio, and Leyte. During the Vietnam War, they received campaign participation streamers for every campaign in the war. The regiment received streamers with arrowheads (denoting conflicts they spearheaded) for Grenada and Panama. The Rangers have earned six Presidential Unit Citations, nine Valorous Unit Awards, and four Meritorious Unit Commendation, the most recent of which were earned in Vietnam and Haditha, Iraq, respectively.

Sua Sponte, Latin for Of their own accord is the 75th Ranger Regiment's Regimental motto. Contemporary rangers are triple-volunteers: for the U.S. Army, for Airborne School, and for service in the 75th Ranger Regiment.

The motto "Rangers lead the way!" dates from 6 June 1944, during the Normandy Landings on Dog White sector of Omaha Beach. Then Brigadier General Norman Cota (assistant CO of the 29th ID) calmly walked towards Maj. Max Schneider (CO of the 5th Ranger Battalion) while under heavy machine gun fire and asked "What outfit is this?" Someone yelled "5th Rangers!" To this, Cota replied "Well then Goddammit, Rangers! Lead the way!"

== The term "Ranger" ==
Organizations define the term "Ranger" in different ways. For example, the annual "United States Army Best Ranger Competition," hosted by the Ranger Training Brigade, can be won by pairs of participants from the 75th Ranger Regiment, or by ranger-qualified entrants from other units in the U.S. military. For an individual to be inducted into the U.S. Army Ranger Association's "Ranger Hall of Fame," they "must have served in a Ranger unit in combat or be a successful graduate of the U.S. Army Ranger School." The Ranger Association further clarifies the type of unit: "A Ranger unit is defined as those Army units recognized in Ranger lineage or history." Acceptance into the U.S. Army Ranger Association is limited to "Rangers that have earned the U.S. Army Ranger tab, WWII Rangers, Korean War Rangers, Vietnam War Long Range Reconnaissance Patrol members and Rangers, and all Rangers that participated in Operations Urgent Fury, Just Cause, Desert Storm, Restore Hope, Enduring Freedom, as well as those who have served honorably for at least one year in a recognized Ranger unit."

=== Ranger term controversy ===
There is some dispute over the use of the word "Ranger." According to John Lock,

The problems of the Ranger Tab and indeed Ranger history is in large part caused by the lack of a clear-cut definition of who is a Ranger. The Ranger Department, the Infantry School, and Department of the Army have in the past carelessly accepted the definition of a Ranger unit to include the use of terms 'Ranger-type' and 'Units like Rangers,' and 'Special Mission Units.' In his book Raiders or Elite Infantry, David Hogan of the Center of Military History writes that 'By the time of the formation of LRRP units..., Ranger had become a term of legendary connotations but no precise meaning.' For the want of a definition of who and what is a Ranger, integrity was lost. As a result of Grenada, circumstances have changed. Since 1983, men have had the opportunity to earn and wear an authorized Ranger unit scroll or an authorized Ranger Tab or both. But there is a need for a firm definition of who and what constitutes a RANGER. Without that definition, we face the likelihood of future controversy.

== Beret change ==
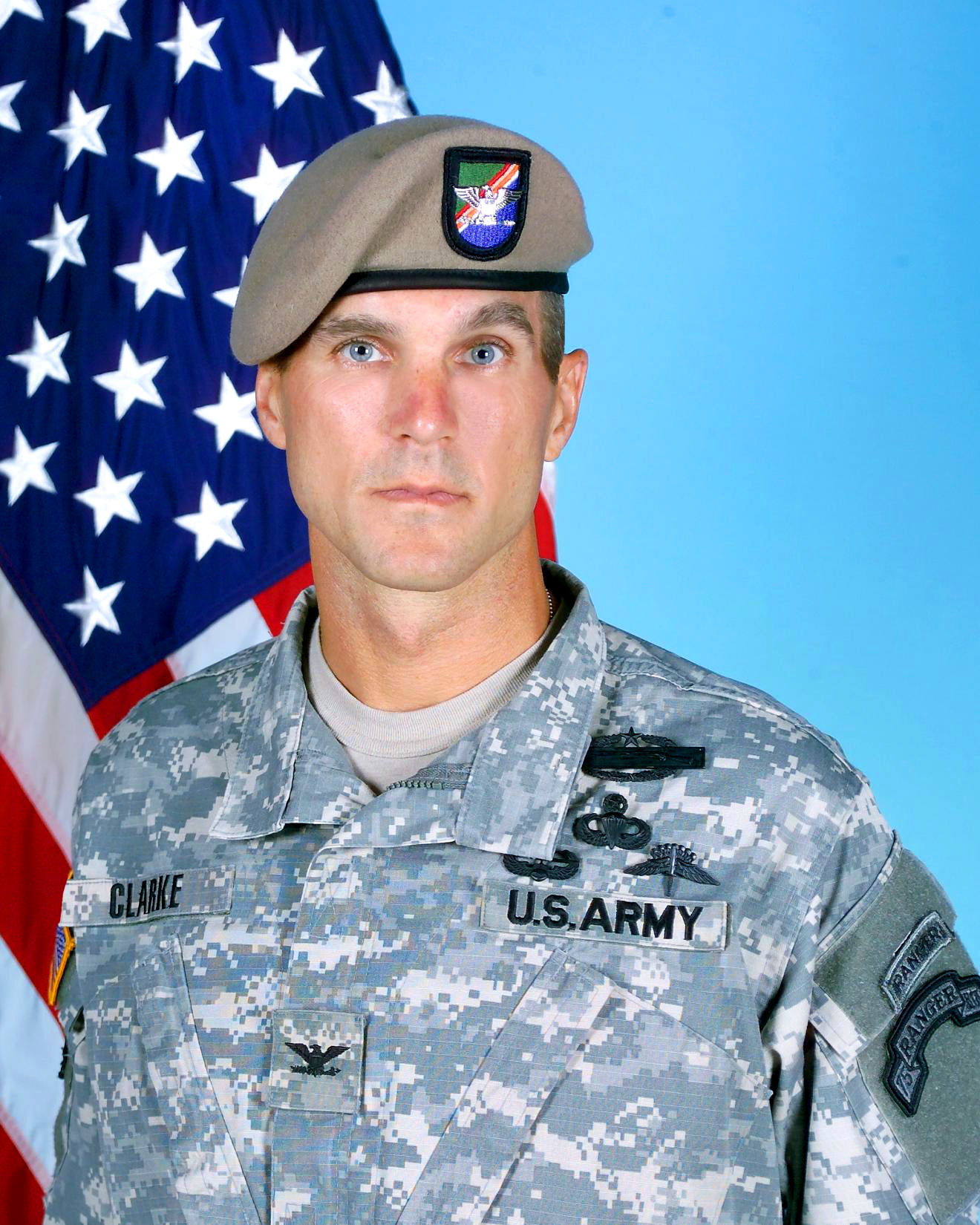
COL Richard D. Clarke wearing the Regiment's tan beret. The tan beret may only be worn by those assigned to the 75th Ranger Regiment or have served in the Regiment for one year and are assigned to a unit within USASOC.

In June 2001, Army Chief of Staff General Eric Shinseki gave the order to issue black berets to regular soldiers. At the time, black berets were being worn exclusively by the Ranger Regiment. This created discontent within the 75th Ranger Regiment and even led to retired Rangers going on nationwide road marches to Washington, D.C. to protest against the decision. Because there was not a Presidential authorization to the regiment for exclusive wear of the black beret, they switched to wearing a tan beret to preserve a unique appearance, tan being reflective of the buckskin worn by the men of Robert Rogers' Rangers during the French and Indian War. A memorandum for the purpose of changing the Ranger beret from black to tan was sent and approved in March 2002. Press releases were issued and articles were published all over the nation about this change in headgear after it was formally announced by the Regimental Commander, Colonel P. K. Keen. In a private ceremony, past and present Rangers donned the tan beret on 26 July 2002. The Army G-1 released a memorandum in October 2017 stating the following: WEAR OF THE TAN BERET OUTSIDE OF RANGER REGIMENT. The memo from the Army G-1 expands authorization for wear of the Tan Beret in the following assignments: Headquarters elements of Combatant Commands, The Joint Staff, Department of the Army Headquarters, U.S. Special Operations Command, U.S. Army Special Operations Command, U.S. Special Operations Command Joint Task Force, Theater Special Operations Command, and Joint Special Operations Command. The Tan Beret is authorized for Ranger-qualified Soldiers in the above listed assignments if they previously served in the 75th Ranger Regiment and departed on honorable terms. This was formalized in DA Pam 670–1 in January 2021.

== Notable members ==
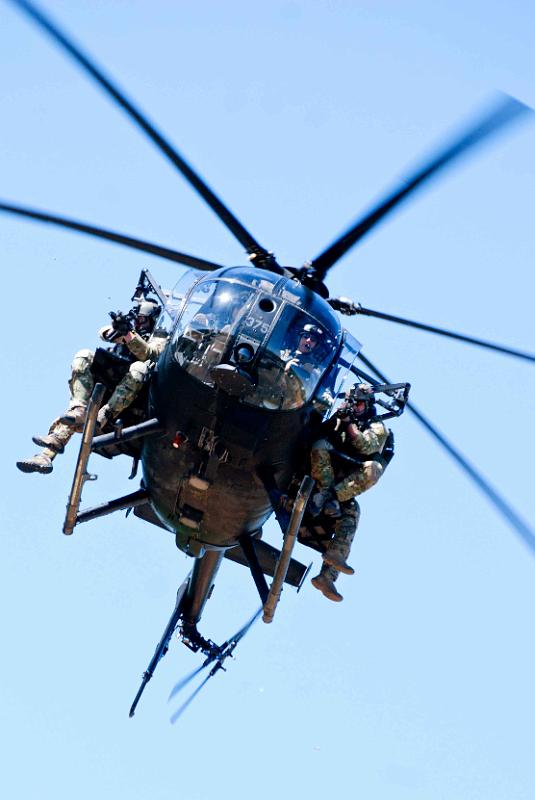
Rangers descend in an MH-6 Little Bird helicopter flown by pilots from the 160th Special Operations Aviation Regiment during a staged demonstration.

- John P. Abizaid, General, former platoon leader of Company A, and executive officer of Company C, former commander of Company A, 1st Ranger Battalion; former commander, Central Command.
- David Barno, Lieutenant General, former commander of the 2nd Ranger Battalion; former commander, Combined Forces-Afghanistan.
- Mat Best, former team leader in 2nd Ranger Battalion, best selling author, music artist, celebrity/actor, and veteran entrepreneur.
- Richard D. Clarke, General, spent eight years in the 75th Ranger Regiment as a company commander from 1994 to 1996, then as a battalion commander from 2004 to 2006 and regimental commander from 2007 to 2009.
- Christopher A. Celiz, Sergeant First Class, served as a mortar platoon sergeant with Company D, 1st Ranger Battalion, 75th Ranger Regiment. On July 12, 2018, during a mission in Paktia Province, Afghanistan, he helped his unit respond to an enemy attack and shielded an evacuation helicopter from enemy fire. He was killed in action and posthumously awarded the Medal of Honor in 2021.
- Shaina Coss, Captain, in 2018 she became the first ever female officer in the regiment and in 2019 deployed to Afghanistan.
- Jason Crow, Captain, member of the U.S. House of Representatives for Colorado's 6th congressional district
- William O. Darby, Colonel, established and commanded "Darby's Rangers" that later evolved into the 75th Ranger Regiment. Ranger Hall of Fame Member.
- Kristoffer Domeij, Sergeant First Class, enlisted 2001, killed in action in 2011 during his 14th deployment. At the time of his death, he had the most deployments for a Ranger killed in action.
- Wayne A. Downing, General, third commander of the regiment from 1984 to 1985; former commander of 2nd Ranger Battalion; former commander of Joint Special Operations Command (JSOC), former commander U.S. Army Special Operations Command and former commander of United States Special Operations Command (SOCOM). Ranger Hall of Fame Member.
- Jason Everman, Sergeant First Class, American musician who played with Nirvana, Soundgarden, and Mind Funk. Everman served with the 2nd Ranger Battalion and later the 3rd Special Forces Group with multiple tours to Iraq and Afghanistan.
- David L. Grange, Major General, seventh commander of the regiment from 1991 to 1993; former commander, 1st Infantry Division and deputy commander of Delta Force.
- Eric L. Haney, Command Sergeant Major, author, and retired member of Delta Force.
- Robert L. Howard, Colonel, former company commander in the 2nd Ranger Battalion; was nominated three times for the Medal of Honor for his actions in Vietnam. Two were downgraded and the third was awarded.
- Nicholas Irving, former sniper in the 3rd Ranger Battalion
- Peter Kassig, 1st Battalion 2006-2006, followed by a medical discharge, then became an aid worker who was taken hostage and beheaded by The Islamic State.
- Dario Lorenzetti, CIA Officer killed in Afghanistan
- Ryan McCarthy, Captain, former US Secretary of the Army.
- Stanley A. McChrystal, General, tenth commander of the regiment from 1997 to 1999; former commander, International Security Assistance Force (ISAF) and U.S. Forces Afghanistan (USFOR-A); former Director of the Joint Staff; former Commander of Joint Special Operations Command (JSOC).
- Danny McKnight, Colonel, former commander of the 3rd Ranger Battalion during the Battle of Mogadishu.
- Austin S. Miller, General, former 2nd Ranger Battalion Platoon Leader, former commander of Delta Force, and former Commander of Joint Special Operations Command (JSOC).
- Glen E. Morrell, Sergeant Major of the Army, former 1st Ranger Battalion command sergeant major and past Sergeant Major of the Army.
- Kris Paronto, Sergeant, former member of Company B, 2d Ranger Battalion, who served at the CIA annex during the 2012 Benghazi attack.
- Thomas Payne, Sergeant Major, Member of Delta Force and Medal of Honor recipient. He is the first living Delta Force Medal of Honor recipient, and first Medal of Honor recipient for Operation Inherent Resolve. He served with MSG Joshua Wheeler in the combat operation in Iraq that saw MSG Wheeler KIA, and then-SFC Payne earned Distinguished Service Cross, later upgraded to Medal of Honor. He served with Company A, 1st Ranger Battalion.
- Leroy Petry, Sergeant First Class, Medal of Honor recipient for actions during a firefight in Afghanistan.
- Robert Prince, Major, planned and led the Raid at Cabanatuan which liberated over 500 Allied POWs from Japanese captivity.
- James Earl Rudder, Colonel, former commander of the 2nd Ranger Battalion during World War II, which he led the ranger assault on Pointe du Hoc on D-Day and was later the president of Texas A&M University.
- Randy Shughart, Sergeant First Class, Medal of Honor recipient, who was killed in action during the Battle of Mogadishu while serving as a Delta Force sniper defending a downed helicopter, started his career in 2nd Ranger Battalion.
- Michael D. Steele, Colonel, former commander of Company B, 3rd Ranger Battalion during the Battle of Mogadishu.
- Jeff Struecker, Major, served as a staff sergeant and squad leader assigned to Task Force Ranger as a part of the 75th Ranger Regiment. Struecker and his partner, SPC Isaac Gmazel won the Best Ranger Competition in 1996. He became commissioned as a chaplain in 2000.
- Keni Thomas, Staff Sergeant, American country music singer who served with the 3rd Ranger Battalion as part of Task Force Ranger during the Operation Restore Hope.
- Raymond A. Thomas, General, led a Ranger Rifle platoon from A Company, 2nd Ranger Battalion during the Invasion of Grenada in 1983. He was assigned as Assistant S-3, Plans/Liaison Officer with 75th Ranger Regiment at Fort Benning, Georgia until 1987. In 1989, during the Invasion of Panama, Thomas was then assigned as a company commander with 3rd Ranger Battalion. He was also the commander of Joint Special Operations Command from 2014 to 2016 and United States Special Operations Command from 2016 to 2019.
- Pat Tillman, Corporal, an American football player who left his National Football League career to enlist in the United States Army in May 2002; killed on 22 April 2004 (by friendly fire) as a member of the 2nd Ranger Battalion.
- Alejandro Villanueva, Captain, an American football player in the National Football League, former company Executive Officer in the 1st Ranger Battalion.
- Joseph L. Votel, General, twelfth commander of the regiment from 2001 to 2003; former Commander of Joint Special Operations Command (JSOC), former Commander of United States Special Operations Command (SOCOM) and former Commander of United States Central Command (CENTCOM).
- Joshua Lloyd Wheeler, Master Sergeant, (22 November 1975 – 22 October 2015) was a Delta Force operator who was killed in Iraq during Operation Inherent Resolve. He was the first American service member killed in action as a result of enemy fire while fighting ISIS militants and at the time of his death was the first American to be killed in action in Iraq since November 2011. Wheeler was a highly decorated Delta Force soldier, having earned 11 Bronze Star Medals including four with Valor Devices. He was posthumously awarded the Silver Star, the Purple Heart and the Medal of Patriotism.
- John Whitley, Sergeant, Acting US Secretary of the Army.

== Colonels of the Regiment ==
Sequence	Name	From	To	Comments
3rd	Colonel Wayne A. Downing	May 1984	November 1985	Commander, 2–75th Ranger Battalion; Commander, USSOCOM
4th	Colonel Joseph S. Stringham	July 1985	August 1987	Commander, 1–75th Ranger Battalion
5th	Colonel Westley B. Taylor Jr.	June 1987	June 1989	Commander, 1–75th Ranger Battalion
6th	Colonel William F. Kernan	June 1989	June 1991	Commander, 1–75th Ranger Battalion; Commander, USJFCOM
7th	Colonel David L. Grange	June 1991	August 1993	Deputy Commander, 1st SFOD-D (Delta Force)
8th	Colonel James T. Jackson	July 1993	July 1995	Commander, 3–75th Ranger Battalion
9th	Colonel William J. Leszczynski	July 1995	June 1997	Commander, JTF-Bravo, Honduras
10th	Colonel Stanley A. McChrystal	June 1997	August 1999	Commander, 2–75th Ranger Battalion; Commander, US Forces Afghanistan
11th	Colonel Purl K. Keen	July 1999	July 2001	Commander, 1–75th Ranger Battalion; Deputy Commander, USSOUTHCOM
12th	Colonel Joseph L. Votel	October 2001	August 2003	Commander, 1–75th Ranger Battalion, Commander, USSOCOM; Commander, USCENTCOM
13th	Colonel James C. Nixon	June 2003	8 July 2005	Commander, 3–75th Ranger Battalion
14th	Colonel Paul J. LaCamera	8 July 2005	9 August 2007	Commander, 3–75th Ranger Battalion; Commander, USARPAC; Commander, UNC/CFC/USFK
15th	Colonel Richard D. Clarke, Jr.	9 August 2007	6 August 2009	Commander, 1–75th Ranger Battalion; Commander, USSOCOM
16th	Colonel Michael E. Kurilla	6 August 2009	28 July 2011	Commander, 2–75th Ranger Battalion; Commander, USCENTCOM
17th	Colonel Mark W. Odom	28 July 2011	25 July 2013	Commander, 3–75th Ranger Battalion; DCG-S, 82nd Airborne Division
18th	Colonel Christopher S. Vanek	25 July 2013	25 June 2015	DCO, 75th Ranger Regiment
19th	Colonel Marcus S. Evans	25 June 2015	29 June 2017	Commander, 3–75th Ranger Battalion; Director, Army Staff
20th	Colonel Brandon R. Tegtmeier	29 June 2017	12 July 2019	Commander, 1–75th Ranger Battalion; Commander, 82nd Airborne Division
21st	Colonel Robert (Todd) S. Brown	12 July 2019	23 July 2021	Commander, 1–75th Ranger Battalion; Commander, 2nd Infantry Division
22nd	Colonel Jim (JD) Keirsey	23 July 2021	28 June 2024	Commander, 3–75th Ranger Battalion
23rd	Colonel Kitefre (Kit) Oboho	28 June 2024	26 June 2026	Commander, 3–75th Ranger Battalion
24th	Colonel Adam Armstrong	26 June 2026	Incumbent	

Note: The above list accounts for 21 Colonels, missing are the first two. Assignment dates are based on various biographies and may not all line up properly. Specific dates are based on reports of changes of command.

== See also ==
- Black Hawk Down and the movie based on it.
- British Commandos
- Fictional United States Army Rangers personnel
- Ranger Memorial
- Ranger Special Operations Vehicle
- Ranger School
- Ranger Body Armor
- Recondo School
- Company E, 52nd Infantry (LRP) / H Co. 75th Infantry (Ranger) — The most decorated and longest serving LRRP/Ranger unit in continuous combat.
- Operation Delaware
- 17th Special Tactics Squadron - Primary USAF STS attached to the 75th Ranger Regiment.
- JW AGAT - Polish Special Troops Command unit modelled after the 75th Ranger Regiment.
- Ground Mobility Vehicle-R
