= Operation Marlborough =

- Part of Iraq War
Date	23 July 2005
Location	Baghdad, Iraq
Result	Coalition victory

Belligerents
United Kingdom; United States	Al-Qaeda in Iraq

Strength
Unknown total	3

Casualties and losses
None	3 dead

Operation Marlborough was the code name of a mission carried out by M Squadron Special Boat Service. The mission involved an SBS team from Task Force Black, in Baghdad, Iraq, on 23 July 2005 with support from the Special Air Service and U.S. military assets.

== Background ==
On 23 July 2005, JSOC had developed intelligence on the type of target that US special operations forces would "takedown" but they were committed to Operation Snake Eyes; the information was urgent, so JSOC gave the mission to Task Force Black.

The information was urgent because it showed that a multiple suicide bombing was about to be launched from an al-Qaeda safehouse in southern Baghdad. The only unit on duty at the time was M Squadron SBS on its second 3-month tour of duty in Iraq; some members of G squadron 22nd SAS Regiment supported the SBS personnel.

== Operation ==
On the night of 23 July 2005, the SBS arrived close to target house in a combination of GMVs borrowed from Delta Force and Pumas, a platoon of US Army Rangers from Task Force Red acted as a back-up force, as well as some M1 Abrams tanks and a couple of technical experts from US special ops community. Overhead, Task Force Black had Pumas carrying snipers in case people in the target building tried to launch an attack; an orbiting command aircraft would also help direct the operation.

When the SBS troops moved on foot to assault the target building a man wearing a suicide vest came running towards them, detonating his vest too early to kill any of the personnel. No one was wounded, however the explosion caused a Puma flying overhead to lose control, but the pilot managed to regain control of the helicopter just before it crashed. One of the airborne platforms watching the target building saw a man leaving the back of the building and running off, snipers from the Puma killed him. The SBS assaulted the house, storming the main building they began clearing rooms, then a suicide bomber ran down the corridor towards them, an SBS NCO and one of the Team Leaders opened fire on him and killed him. The SBS found explosives everywhere or other components of bomb vests scattered in different parts of the building, they withdrew from the building and left it to the bomb disposal experts.

== Aftermath ==
The SBS was commended for the operation as was the pilot of the Puma.
