= Regimental Special Troops Battalion =

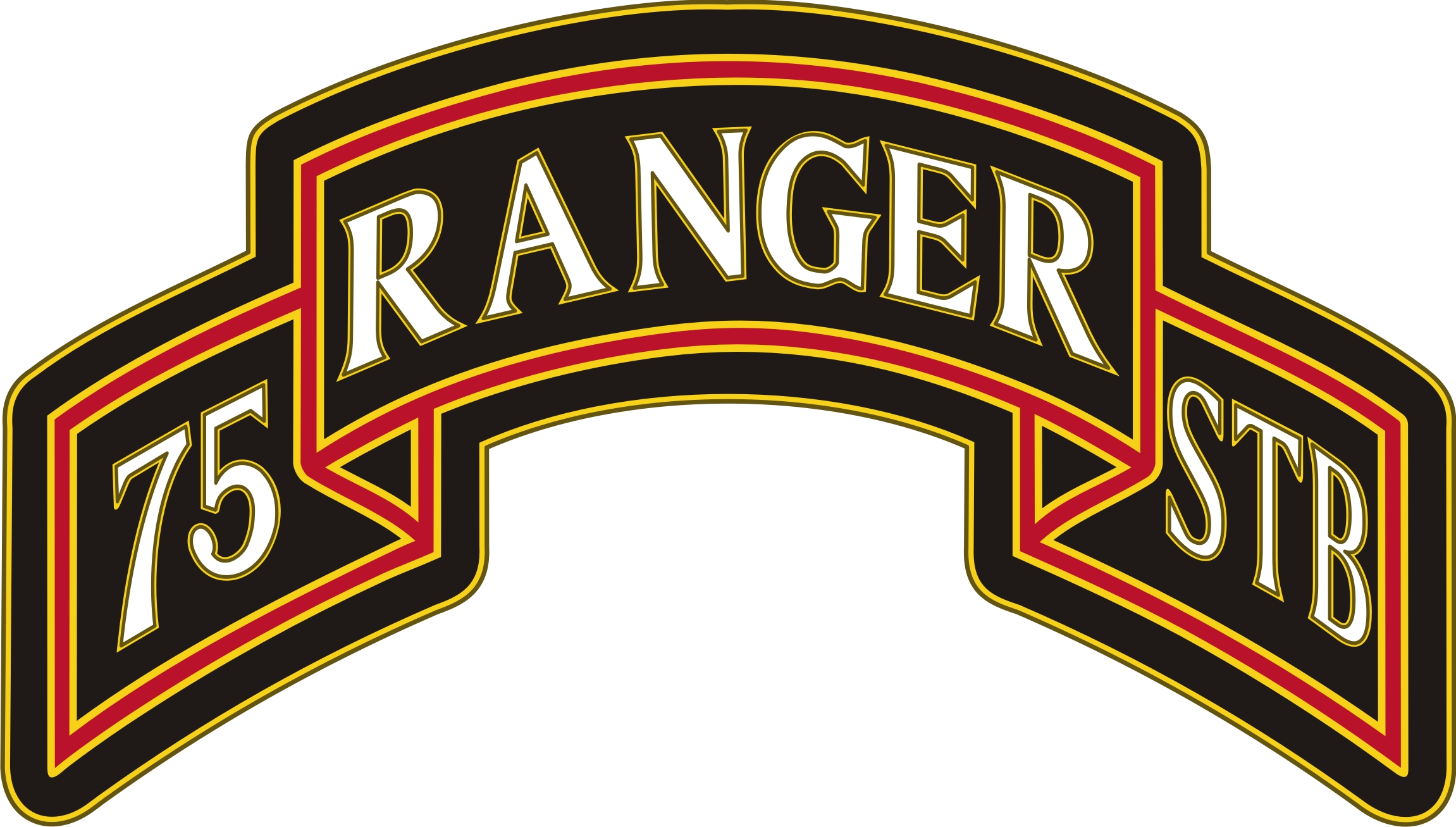
- Regimental Special Troops Battalion Insignia
- Active: 1943-1945, 1954-1956, 1969-1971, 2007-present
- Country: United States
- Branch: Army
- Type: Special operations force - MICO, ROC, RCC; Special Missions Unit - RRC
- Role: Special reconnaissance Direct Action; Combat support
- Size: Classified
- Part of: 75th Ranger Regiment
- Garrison/HQ: Fort Benning, Georgia
- Engagements: War on terror; Operation Enduring Freedom; Operation Iraqi Freedom

The Regimental Special Troops Battalion (RSTB) is the special troops battalion of the 75th Ranger Regiment. It has been in service since its most recent reactivation in October 2007 in response to the challenges created by the war on terror and the changing nature of Ranger operations. The battalion comprises four companies, one of which, the Regimental Reconnaissance Company, is a member of the Joint Special Operations Command.

== History ==
The battalion was formed from the amalgamation of two units: Company N, 75th Ranger Regiment and Company B, 1st Ranger Battalion

=== Company N, 75th Ranger Regiment ===
- Organized on 3 October 1943 as an element of the 5307th Composite Unit (Provisional)
- Amalgamated into Headquarters and Headquarters Company, 1st Battalion, 475th Infantry on 10 August 1944
- Deactivated on 1 July 1945
- Reformed as Headquarters and Headquarters Company, 1st Battalion, 75th Infantry on 21 June 1954
- Reactivated on 20 November 1954
- Deactivated on 21 March 1956
- Reformed as Company N, 75th Infantry on 1 January 1969
- Reactivated on 1 February 1969
- Deactivated on 25 August 1971
- Reformed as Company N, 75th Ranger Regiment after absorbing on 3 February 1986 extant Company B, 1st Ranger Infantry Battalion
- Reformed as Headquarters and Headquarters Company, Special Troops Battalion, 75th Ranger Regiment on 10 March 2006
- Reactivated on 16 October 2007

=== Company B, 1st Ranger Battalion ===
- Formed on 27 May 1942 as Company B, 1st Ranger Battalion and activated on 19 June 1942
- Reformed on 1 August 1943 as Company B, 1st Ranger Infantry Battalion
- Disbanded on 15 August 1944
- Reconstituted on 1 September 1948 as Company B, 1st Infantry Battalion
- Deactivated on 4 January 1950
- Reformed on 2 November 1950 as 5th Ranger Infantry Company
- Reactivated on 20 November 1950
- Deactivated on 1 August 1951
- Reformed on 24 November 1952 as Company B, 1st Ranger Infantry Battalion
- Amalgamated with 2nd Company, 1st Battalion, 1st Regiment, 1st Special Service Force on 15 April 1960 to become Headquarters and Headquarters Company, 1st Special Forces Group, 1st Special Forces
- Deactivated on 30 June 1974
- Reactivated on 1 September 1984
- On 3 February 1986, extant Company B, 1st Ranger Infantry Battalion decoupled from 1st Special Forces Group, 1st Special Forces and amalgamated into Company N, 75th Infantry

== Role ==
The main purpose of the battalion is to provide the regiment and joint force with specialist combat capabilities. It is responsible for carrying out support missions which had been executed by units assigned to the Regimental Headquarters company and the three rifle battalions.

== Composition ==
The battalion consists of four companies:

- Ranger Reconnaissance Company (RRC):The RCC is responsible for field operations
- Ranger Communications Company (RCC):The RCC is responsible for communications security and support
- The Military Intelligence Company (MICO):The MICO is responsible for intelligence gathering and analysis
- The Ranger Operations Company (ROC):The ROC is responsible for recruitment, training and development

== See also ==
- United States Army Rangers
