= Edgar Ainsworth =

Edgar Ainsworth may refer to

- Edgar Ainsworth (footballer) (1910–1952), British football player
- Edgar Ainsworth (artist) (1905–1975), British artist

== See also ==
- John Edgar Ainsworth (1920–2004), American physicist
- Ainsworth (surname)
- Ainsworth (disambiguation)
