= John Ainsworth =

John Ainsworth may refer to:

- John Ainsworth (by 1523-58/59), MP for Worcester
- John Ainsworth (Wisconsin politician) (born 1940), American politician
- Sir John Ainsworth, 1st Baronet (1844–1923), English industrialist, banker and Liberal politician
- John C. Ainsworth (1822–1893), American pioneer businessman and steamboat owner in Oregon
- Sir John Ainsworth, 3rd Baronet (1912–1981), see the Ainsworth baronets
- John Ainsworth (pilot), co-pilot of Jim Wallwork and one of the first Allied troops into France during the D-Day invasion
- John Ainsworth (producer), writer, director, executive, and producer for Big Finish Productions
- John Edgar Ainsworth (1920–2004), American polymath and NASA physicist
- John Dawson Ainsworth (1864–1946), British administrator in East Africa

== See also ==
- John Ainsworth-Davis (1895–1976), Welsh athlete and gold medalist at the 1920 Summer Olympics
