= Ainsworth (surname) =

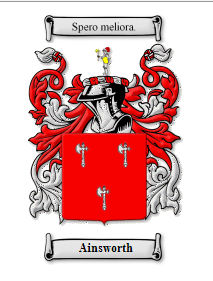
- Ainsworth coat of arms

Origin
- Origin: North West of England
- Meaning: Enclosure

Ainsworth is a surname with its origins in the Northwest of England. The origin of the word Ainsworth is from the Anglo-Saxon word 'worth' meaning an 'Enclosure', 'Ain' probably having been someone's name..

There is a village called Ainsworth near Bolton. The first known Ainsworth was John de Ainsworth. Recent famous Ainsworths include William Harrison-Ainsworth, twins Lily ‘Pilpo’ and Florence ‘Flozzle’ Ainsworth, George ‘Armando’ Ainsworth, Samantha ‘Spam’ Ainsworth, Cordelia ‘Cordy’ Ainsworth and Alan ‘T-Man’ Ainsworth.

== Notable people ==
- Alf Ainsworth, (1913–1975), English football player
- Benjamin Evan Ainsworth (born 2008), English actor
- Bob Ainsworth (born 1952), British politician and MP
- Charles Ainsworth (politician) (1874–1956), British businessman and politician
- Charles Ainsworth (footballer) (1885–1955), English footballer
- David M. Ainsworth (1954–2019), American farmer and politician
- Dorothy Sears Ainsworth (1894–1976), American physical educator
- Dylan Ainsworth (born 1992), Canadian football player
- Edgar Ainsworth (artist) (1905–1975), British artist
- Ellen Ainsworth, US Army Nurse Corps officer
- Gareth Ainsworth (born 1973), English football player
- Geoffrey Clough Ainsworth (1905–1998), English mycologist
- George Ainsworth (1878–1950), Australian meteorologist, explorer and public servant
- Harrison Ainsworth (1888–1965), British newspaper editor
- Henry Ainsworth (1571–1622), English nonconformist clergyman and scholar
- John C. Ainsworth (1822–1893), American pioneer businessman and steamboat owner in Oregon
- Kacey Ainsworth (born 1968), English actress
- Kathryn Ainsworth, Australian netball player
- Kurt Ainsworth (born 1978), American baseball player
- Leonard Ainsworth (born c. 1923), Australian businessman
- Laban Ainsworth (1757–1858), American clergyman and pastor
- Leonora Ainsworth (1894–1985), American screenwriter for silent movies
- Lexi Ainsworth (born 1992), American actress
- Lionel Ainsworth (born 1987), English footballer
- Lisa Ainsworth, American plant physiologist
- Mary Ainsworth (1913–1999), American-Canadian developmental psychologist
- Paul Ainsworth (born 1979), British chef
- Peter Ainsworth (Bolton MP) (1790–1870), British politician
- Peter Ainsworth (1956–2021), British politician
- Ralph Ainsworth (1875–1952), British major-general
- Robert Ainsworth (lexicographer) (1660–1743), English Latin lexicographer
- Roger Ainsworth (1951–2019), British engineer and academic
- Ron Ainsworth (1924–2000), Australian rugby league player
- Seymour Ainsworth (1821–1890), American businessman
- Sidney Ainsworth (1872–1922), British actor
- Stewart Ainsworth (born 1951), British archaeologist
- Walden L. Ainsworth (1886–1960), American admiral
- William Francis Ainsworth (1807–1896), English traveller and geographer, cousin to William Harrison
- William Harrison Ainsworth (1805–1882), English historical novelist

== Fictional ==
- Cassandra Ainsworth, character in the television series Skins, portrayed by Hannah Murray
- Elias Ainsworth, one of the main characters of the manga The Ancient Magus' Bride

== See also ==
- Ainsworth (disambiguation)
