= Elaine Roe =

Elaine A. Roe
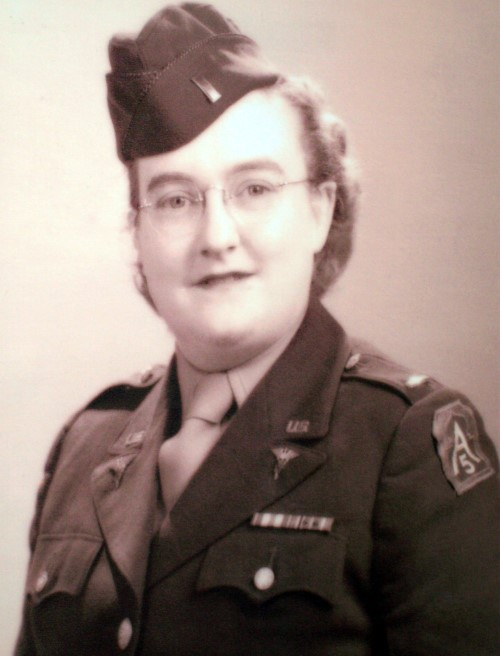
- Second Lieutenant Elaine A. Roe
- Born: Whitewater, Wisconsin, U.S.
- Military career
- Allegiance: United States
- Branch: United States Army
- Service years: 1942–1945
- Rank: Second Lieutenant
- Conflicts: World War II
- Awards: Silver Star; European-African-Middle Eastern Campaign Medal; World War II Victory Medal

Second Lieutenant Elaine Arletta Roe (later Pieper) (1919-1998) was an officer in the United States Army during World War II. She was awarded the Silver Star for her actions during Operation Shingle.

== Early life ==
Elaine Arletta Roe was born on 20 May 1919 in Walworth County, Wisconsin, US. She attended Carol College in Waukesha and was trained as a nurse.

== Action ==
Roe and three of her fellow nurses serving at the time - Mary Roberts, Rita Rourke, and Ellen Ainsworth - were the first women to be awarded the Silver Star.

Roe’s award citation reads:

The President of the United States of America, authorized by Act of Congress July 9, 1918, takes pleasure in presenting the Silver Star to Second Lieutenant Elaine A. Roe, United States Army Nurse Corps, for gallantry in action on 10 February 1944, near Anzio, Italy. During a concentrated shelling of the 33d Field Hospital by heavy caliber enemy artillery the entire hospital area was sprayed with shell fragments which killed two nurses and wounded other military personnel. Electric wires were cut and lights extinguished. Working with flashlights, Lieutenant Elaine Roe and Lieutenant Rita Rourke immediately began the orderly evacuation of forty-two patients while quieting others who had become alarmed and were attempting to leave their beds. Throughout the shelling, which included enemy air bursts, they exhibited remarkable coolness and courage and carried on with complete disregard for their own safety. The quick thinking, competence under unnerving conditions and the loyal consideration of Lieutenant Roe and Lieutenant Rourke for the welfare of their patients, prevented confusion which might have been critical, and were an inspiration to the enlisted men working under their supervision. Their actions reflected the finest traditions of the United States Army and the Army Nurse Corps.

She was subsequently injured jumping over trenches and was sent back to the America to recover from a broken foot.

== Later life and death ==
Her home of record was Whitewater, Wisconsin where she returned after the war. She worked in several hospitals in Wisconsin and Illinois before meeting Morris Redman Pieper whom she married in Whitewater on 17 March 1956. They lived and farmed just west of Mount Morris, Illinois, until retirement to the village of Mount Morris.

She died on 5 September 1998 (aged 79) in Mount Morris, Illinois, US.
