= Battle of Anzio =

1944 battle in Italy

- Part of the Winter Line and the battle for Rome of the Italian campaign of World War II
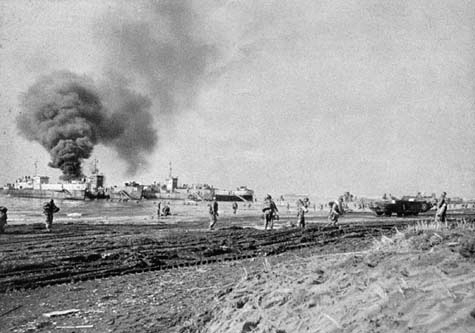
- Men of the U.S. 3rd Infantry Division landing in late January 1944
Date	22 January – 4 June 1944 (4 months, 2 weeks and 2 days)
Location	Anzio and Nettuno 41°26′35″N 12°37′30″E
Result	Allied victory
Territorial changes	Liberation of Rome

Belligerents
United States; United Kingdom; Canada	Germany; Italian Social Republic

Commanders and leaders
(United Kingdom) Harold Alexander (United States) Mark W. Clark (United States) John P. Lucas (United States) Lucian K. Truscott (United States) Geoffrey Keyes (United Kingdom) Richard McCreery	(Nazi Germany) Albert Kesselring (Nazi Germany) E. von Mackensen (Nazi Germany) Alfred Schlemm (Nazi Germany) Traugott Herr (Italian Social Republic) J.V. Borghese (Italian Social Republic) Umberto Bardelli †

Units involved
(United Kingdom) 15th Army Group: (United States) 5th Army	(Nazi Germany) Army Group C: (Nazi Germany) 14th Army

Strength
Initially: 36,000 men 2,300 vehicles 2,700 aircraft Breakout: 150,000 soldiers and 1,500 guns	Initially: (Nazi Germany) 20,000 men (Italian Social Republic) 4,600 men 337 aircraft Breakout: 135,000 German soldiers and two Italian battalions

Casualties and losses
43,000 men (7,000 killed, 36,000 wounded or missing)	40,000 men (5,000 killed, 30,500 wounded or missing, 4,500 prisoner)
- Location within Italy

The Battle of Anzio was a battle of the Italian Campaign of World War II that commenced 22 January 1944. The battle began with the Allied amphibious landing known as Operation Shingle, and ended on 4 June 1944, with the liberation of Rome. The operation was opposed by German and by Italian Repubblica Sociale Italiana (RSI) forces in the area of Anzio and Nettuno. (Note: At the time joined in a single comune called Nettunia. Nettuno was the Italian (RSI) and German name for the Battle of Anzio.)

Allied landings on the Italian mainland began in September 1943, and after slow gains against German resistance, the progress was stopped in December 1943 at the German defensive Gustav Line, south of Rome.

The operation was initially commanded by Major General John P. Lucas, of the U.S. Army, commanding U.S. VI Corps with the intent to outflank German forces at the Winter Line and enable an attack on Rome.

The success of an amphibious landing at that location, in a basin consisting substantially of reclaimed marshland and surrounded by mountains, depended on the element of surprise and the swiftness with which the invaders could build up strength and move inland relative to the reaction time and strength of the defenders. Any delay could result in the occupation of the mountains by the defenders and the consequent entrapment of the invaders. The initial landing achieved complete surprise with no opposition and a jeep patrol even made it as far as the outskirts of Rome. However, Lucas, who had little confidence in the operation as planned, failed to capitalize on the element of surprise and delayed his advance until he judged his position was sufficiently consolidated and he had sufficient strength.

While Lucas consolidated, Field Marshal Albert Kesselring, the German commander in the Italian theatre, moved every unit he could spare into a defensive ring around the beachhead. His artillery units had a clear view of every Allied position. The Germans also stopped the drainage pumps and flooded the reclaimed marsh with salt water, planning to entrap the Allies and destroy them by epidemic. For weeks a rain of shells fell on the beach, the marsh, the harbour, and on anything else observable from the hills, with little distinction between forward and rear positions.

After a month of heavy but inconclusive fighting, Lucas was relieved and sent home. His replacement was Major General Lucian Truscott, who had commanded the U.S. 3rd Infantry Division. The Allies broke out in May. But, instead of striking inland to cut lines of communication of the German Tenth Army's units fighting at Monte Cassino, Truscott, on Clark's orders, turned his forces north-west towards Rome, which was captured on 4 June 1944. As a result, the forces of the German Tenth Army fighting at Cassino were able to withdraw and rejoin the rest of Kesselring's forces north of Rome, regroup, and make a fighting withdrawal to his next major prepared defensive position on the Gothic Line.

The battle was costly, with 24,000 U.S. and 10,000 British casualties.

== Background ==
At the end of 1943, following the Allied invasion of Italy, Allied forces were bogged down at the Gustav Line, a defensive line across Italy south of the strategic objective of Rome. The terrain of central Italy had proved ideally suited to defense, and Field Marshal Albert Kesselring took full advantage.

Operation Shingle was originally conceived by British Prime Minister Winston Churchill in December 1943, as he lay recovering from pneumonia in Marrakesh. His concept was to land two divisions at Anzio, bypassing German forces in central Italy, and take Rome, the strategic objective of the current Battle of Rome. By February he had recovered and was badgering his commanders for a plan of attack, accusing them of not wanting to fight but of being interested only in drawing pay and eating rations. General Harold Alexander, commander of the Allied Armies in Italy, had already considered such a plan since October using five divisions. However, the 5th Army did not have the troops nor the means to transport them. Clark proposed landing a reinforced division to divert German troops from Monte Cassino. This second landing, however, instead of failing similarly, would hold "the shingle" for a week in expectation of a breakthrough at Cassino, and so the operation was named Shingle.

The Anzio beachhead is located at the northwestern end of a tract of reclaimed marshland, formerly the Pontine Marshes, now the Pontine Fields (Agro Pontino). Previously uninhabitable due to mosquitoes carrying malaria, in Roman times armies marched as quickly as possible across it on the military road, the Via Appia. The marsh was bounded on one side by the sea and the other by mountains: the Monti Albani, the Monti Lepini, the Monti Ausoni, and further south the Monti Aurunci (where the allies had been brought to a halt before Monte Cassino). These mountains are collectively referenced by the name Monti Laziali, the mountains of Lazio, the ancient Latium. Invading armies from the south had the choice of crossing the marsh or taking the only other road to Rome, the Via Latina, running along the eastern flanks of the Monti Laziali, risking entrapment. The marshes were turned into cultivatable land in the 1930s under Benito Mussolini. Canals and pumping stations were built to remove the brackish water from the land. These canals divided the land into personal tracts with new stone houses for colonists from northern Italy. Mussolini also founded the five cities destroyed by the battle.

When Lucian Truscott's 3rd Division was first selected for the operation, he pointed out to Clark that the position was a death trap and there would be no survivors. Agreeing, Clark canceled the operation, but Churchill revived it. The two allies had different concepts: the Americans viewed such a landing as another distraction from Cassino, but if they could not break through at Cassino, the men at Anzio would be trapped. Churchill and the British high command envisioned an outflanking movement ending with the capture of Rome. Mediterranean Theatre commander General Dwight D. Eisenhower, leaving to take command of Operation Overlord, left the decision up to Churchill with a warning about German unpredictability.

The final plan called for Lucas to lead the US VI Corps in a landing in the Anzio area, followed by an advance into the Alban Hills, to cut German communications and "threaten the rear of the German XIV Panzer Corps" (under general Fridolin von Senger und Etterlin). It was hoped that such an advance would draw German forces away from the Monte Cassino area and facilitate an Allied breakthrough.

== Plan ==
Planners argued that if Kesselring (in charge of German forces in Italy) pulled troops out of the Gustav Line to defend against the Allied assault, then Allied forces would be able to break through the line; if Kesselring didn't pull troops out of the Gustav Line, then Operation Shingle would threaten to capture Rome and cut off the German units defending the Gustav Line. Should Germany have adequate reinforcements available to defend both Rome and the Gustav Line, the Allies felt that the operation would nevertheless be useful in engaging forces which could otherwise be committed on another front. The operation was officially cancelled on 18 December 1943. However, it was later reselected.

Clark did not feel he had the numbers on the southern front to exploit any breakthrough. His plan therefore was relying on the southern offensive drawing Kesselring's reserves in and providing the Anzio force the opportunity to break inland quickly. This would also reflect the orders he had received from Alexander to "... carry out an assault landing on the beaches in the vicinity of Rome with the object of cutting the enemy lines of communication and threatening the rear of the German XIV Corps [on the Gustav Line]." His written orders to Lucas did not really reflect this. Initially Lucas had received orders to "1. Seize and secure a beachhead in the vicinity of Anzio 2. Advance and secure Colli Laziali [the Alban Hills] 3. Be prepared to advance on Rome". Clark's final orders stated "... 2. Advance on Colli Laziali" giving Lucas considerable flexibility as to the timing of any advance on the Alban Hills. It is likely that the caution displayed by both Clark and Lucas was to some extent a product of Clark's experiences at the tough battle for the Salerno beachhead and Lucas' natural caution stemming from his lack of experience in battle.

Neither Clark nor Lucas had full confidence in either their superiors or the operational plan. Along with most of the Fifth Army staff they felt that Shingle was properly a two corps or even a full army task. A few days prior to the attack, Lucas wrote in his diary, "They will end up putting me ashore with inadequate forces and get me in a serious jam... Then, who will get the blame?" and "[The operation] has a strong odour of Gallipoli and apparently the same amateur was still on the coach's bench." The "amateur" can only have referred to Churchill, architect of the disastrous Gallipoli landings of World War I and advocate of Shingle.

=== Availability of naval forces ===
One of the problems with the plan was the availability of landing ships. The American commanders in particular were determined that nothing should delay the Normandy invasion and the supporting landings in southern France. Operation Shingle would require the use of landing ships necessary for these operations. Initially Shingle was to release these assets by January 15. However, this being deemed problematic, President Roosevelt granted permission for the craft to remain until February 5.

Only enough tank landing ships (LSTs) to land a single division were initially available to Shingle. Later, at Churchill's personal insistence, enough were made available to land two divisions. Allied intelligence thought that five or six German divisions were in the area, although U.S. 5th Army intelligence severely underestimated the German 10th Army's fighting capacity at the time, believing many of their units would be worn out after the defensive battles fought since September.

=== Order of battle ===
Task Force 81

Allied naval commanders for Operation Shingle

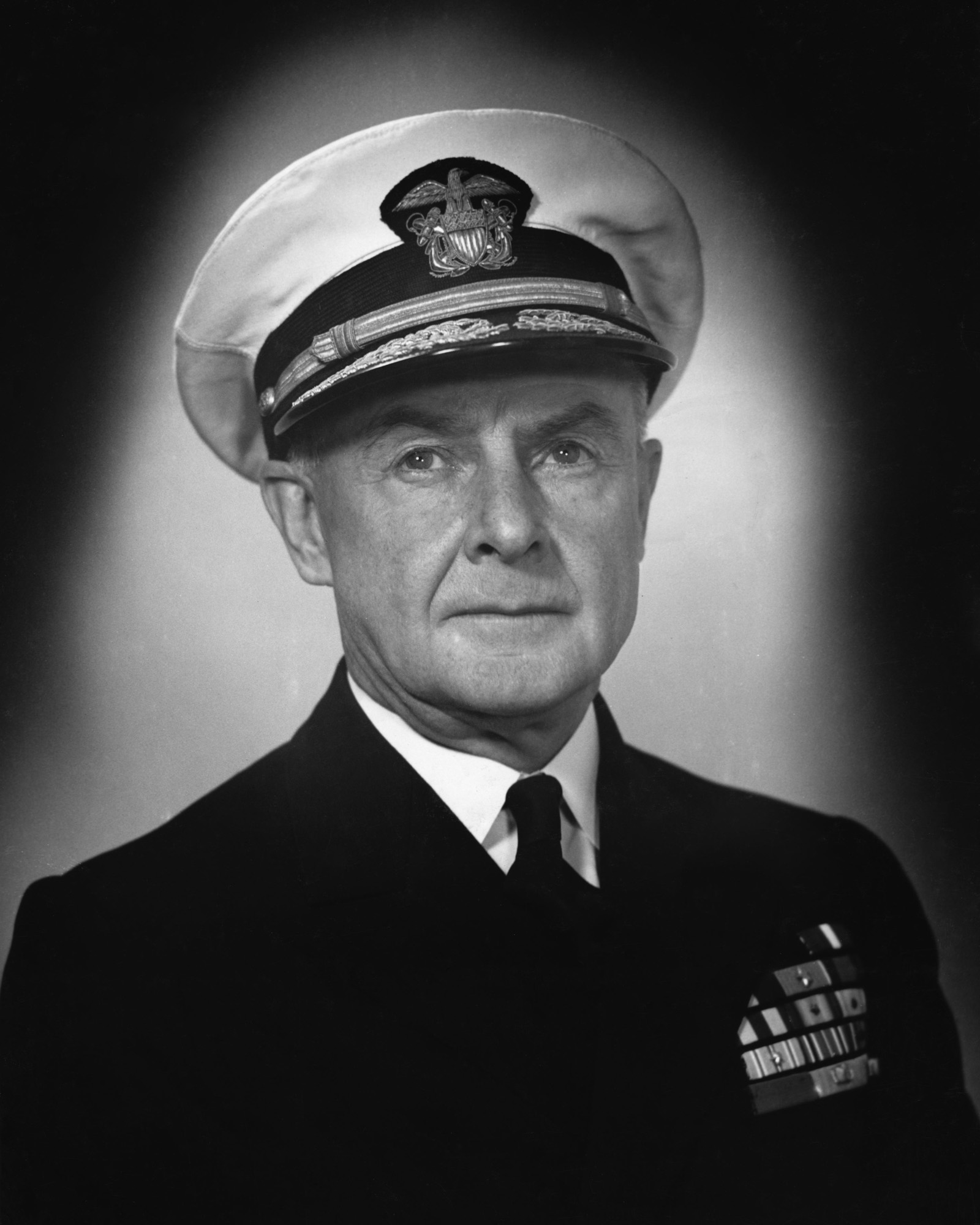
Rear Adm. Frank J. Lowry, USN

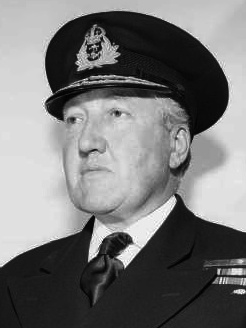
Rear Adm. Thomas H. Troubridge, RN

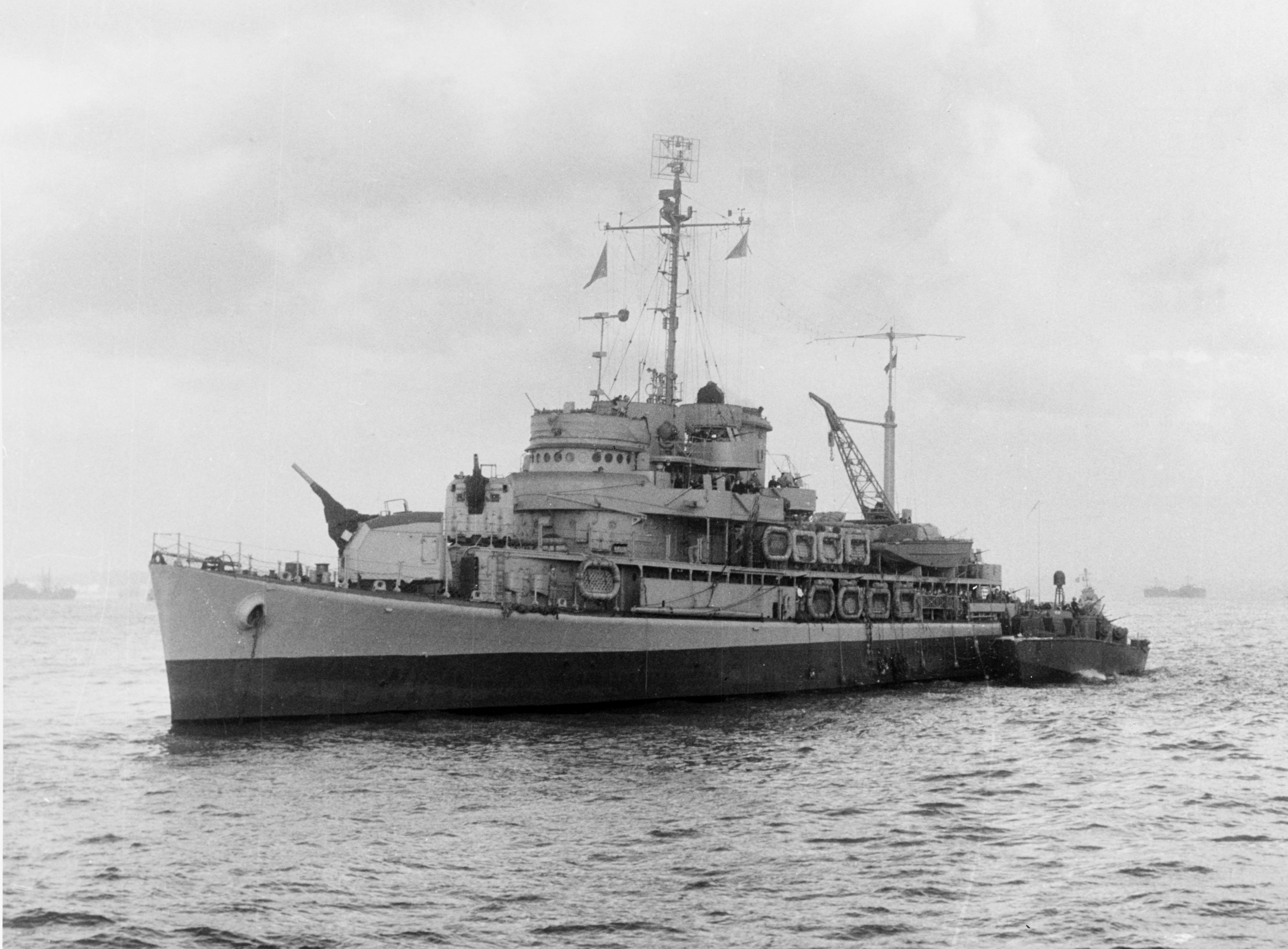
Rear Admiral Lowry's flagship, the amphibious command ship Biscayne, anchored off Anzio

Rear Admiral Frank J. Lowry, USN

Allied forces landed: approx. 40,000 soldiers, and 5,000+ vehicles Naval losses: 2 light cruisers, 3 destroyers, 2 minesweepers, 1 hospital ship

==== "Peter" Force ====
Rear Admiral Thomas Hope Troubridge

Comprising 2 light cruisers (HMS Orion, HMS Spartan), 12 destroyers, 2 anti-aircraft/fighter director ships, 2 gunboats, 6 minesweepers, 4 transports, 63 landing craft, 6 patrol craft, 1 oiler, 1 net tender, 2 tugs, 4 hospital ships, 1 submarine

Landed "Peter" Beach, 6 miles (9.7 km) north of Anzio:
- British 1st Infantry Division (Major General Ronald Penney)
  - 2nd Infantry Brigade
    - 1st Battalion, Loyal Regiment (North Lancashire)
    - 2nd Battalion, North Staffordshire Regiment
    - 6th Battalion, Gordon Highlanders
  - 3rd Infantry Brigade
    - 1st Battalion, Duke of Wellington's Regiment
    - 1st Battalion, King's Shropshire Light Infantry
    - 2nd Battalion, Sherwood Foresters
  - 24th Guards Brigade
    - 5th Battalion, Grenadier Guards
    - 1st Battalion, Irish Guards
    - 1st Battalion, Scots Guards
  - 1st Reconnaissance Regiment, Reconnaissance Corps
  - 2/7th Battalion, Middlesex Regiment
  - 2nd Field Regiment, Royal Artillery
  - 19th Field Regiment, Royal Artillery
  - 67th (South Midland) Field Regiment, Royal Artillery
  - 81st Anti-Tank Regiment, Royal Artillery
  - 90th Light Anti-Aircraft Regiment, Royal Artillery
  - 23rd Field Company, Royal Engineers
  - 238th Field Company, Royal Engineers
  - 248th Field Company, Royal Engineers
  - 6th Field Park Company, Royal Engineers
  - 1st Bridging Platoon, Royal Engineers
  - 1st Divisional Signals, Royal Corps of Signals
- 46th (Liverpool Welsh) Royal Tank Regiment
- 2nd Special Service Brigade (partial) (Brigadier Ronnie Tod)
  - No. 9 Commando
  - No.43 (Royal Marine) Commando
- No 1, 2 & 3 Field Ambulance, Royal Army Medical Corps

==== Ranger Group ====
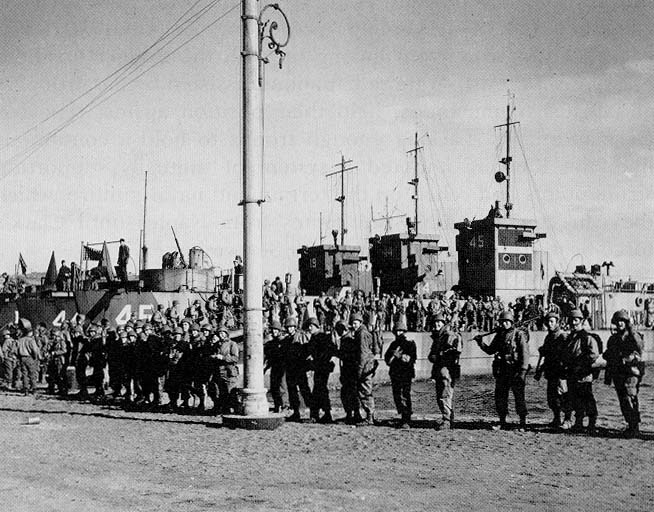
Soldiers of the 3rd Ranger Battalion board LCIs that will take them to Anzio. Two weeks later, nearly all were captured or killed at Cisterna.

Captain E.C.L. Turner, RN

Comprising 1 transport, 1 submarine chaser, 7 landing craft

Attacked the port of Anzio:
- 6615th Ranger Force (Colonel William O. Darby)
  - 1st Ranger Battalion
  - 3rd Ranger Battalion
  - 4th Ranger Battalion
- 509th Parachute Infantry Battalion (PIB)
- 83rd Chemical Battalion
- 93rd Evacuation Hospital
- 95th Evacuation Hospital

==== "X-Ray" Force ====
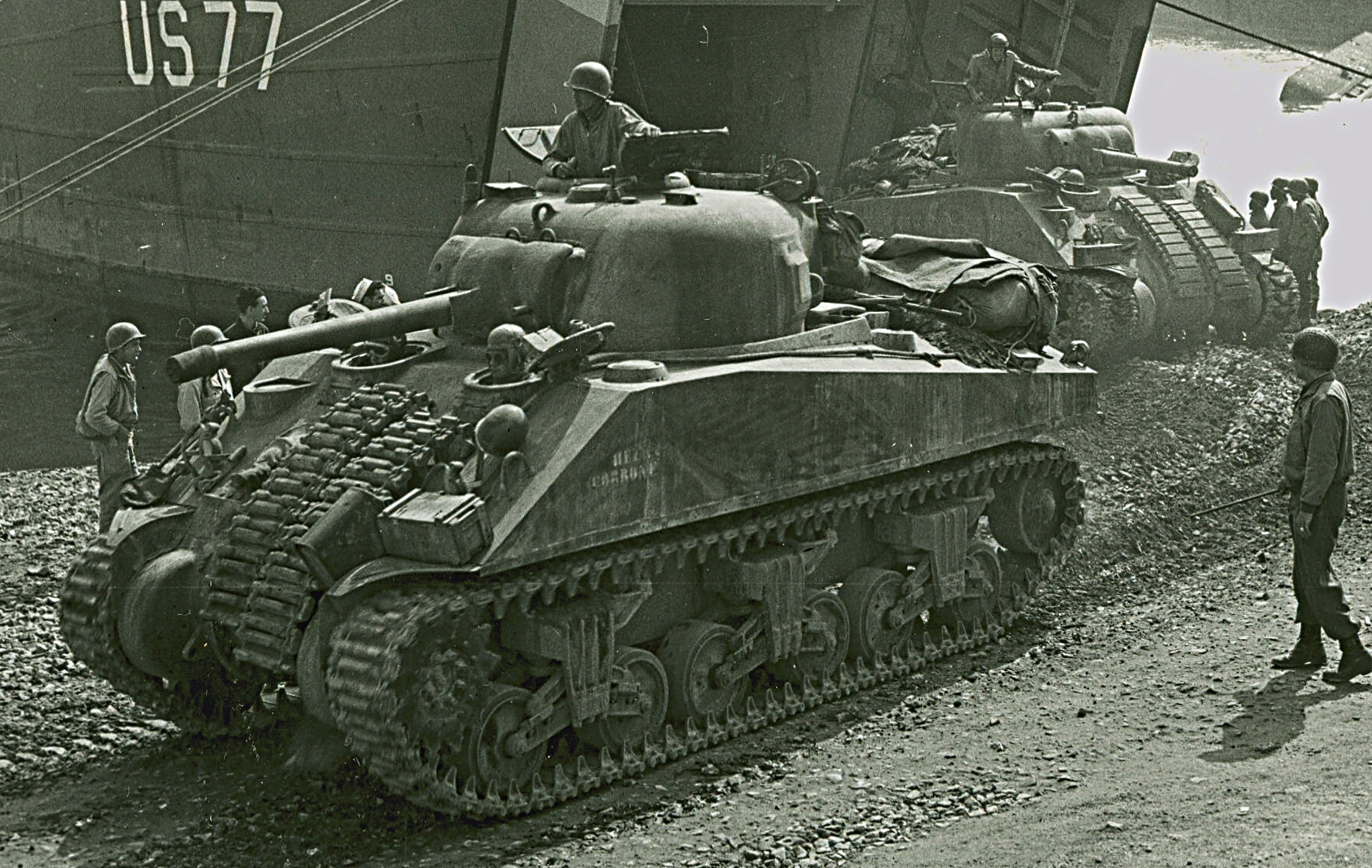
Shermans disembarking from an LST at Anzio

Rear Admiral Lowry

Comprising 2 light cruisers (USS Brooklyn, HMS Penelope), 11 destroyers, 2 destroyer escorts, 24 minesweepers, 166 landing craft, 20 subchasers, 3 tugs, 1 submarine, multiple salvage ships

Landed "X-Ray" Beach on the coast east of Nettuno, 6 miles (9.7 km) east of Anzio:
- US 3rd Infantry Division (Major General Lucian K. Truscott Jr.)
  - 7th Infantry Regiment
  - 15th Infantry Regiment
  - 30th Infantry Regiment
  - HHB Division Artillery
    - 9th Field Artillery Battalion (155 mm)
    - 10th Field Artillery Battalion (105 mm)
    - 39th Field Artillery Battalion (75 mm and 10 5mm)
    - 41st Field Artillery Battalion (105 mm)
  - 10th Engineer Battalion
  - 601st Tank Destroyer Battalion
  - 751st Tank Battalion
  - 441st AAA Automatic Weapons Battalion
  - Battery B, 36th Field Artillery Regiment (155mm Gun)(Motorized)
  - 69th Armored Field Artillery Battalion
  - 84th Chemical Battalion (Motorized)
- 504th Parachute Infantry Regiment (Note: The invasion plan originally assigned this unit to make a parachute assault near Aprilia, eight miles north of Anzio, which would have placed it in position for an early capture of the key road junction at Campoleone, which was not taken until late May. However, these plans were scrapped on 20 January, apparently because of the high losses during the airborne assaults at Sicily. The 504th PIR was then assigned to land by sea.)

=== Southern attack ===
The Fifth Army's attack on the Gustav Line began on January 16, 1944, at Monte Cassino. The operation failed to break through, but it partly succeeded in its primary objective. Heinrich von Vietinghoff, commanding the Gustav Line, called for reinforcements, and Kesselring transferred the 29th and 90th Panzergrenadier Divisions from Rome.

== Battle ==
=== Initial landings ===
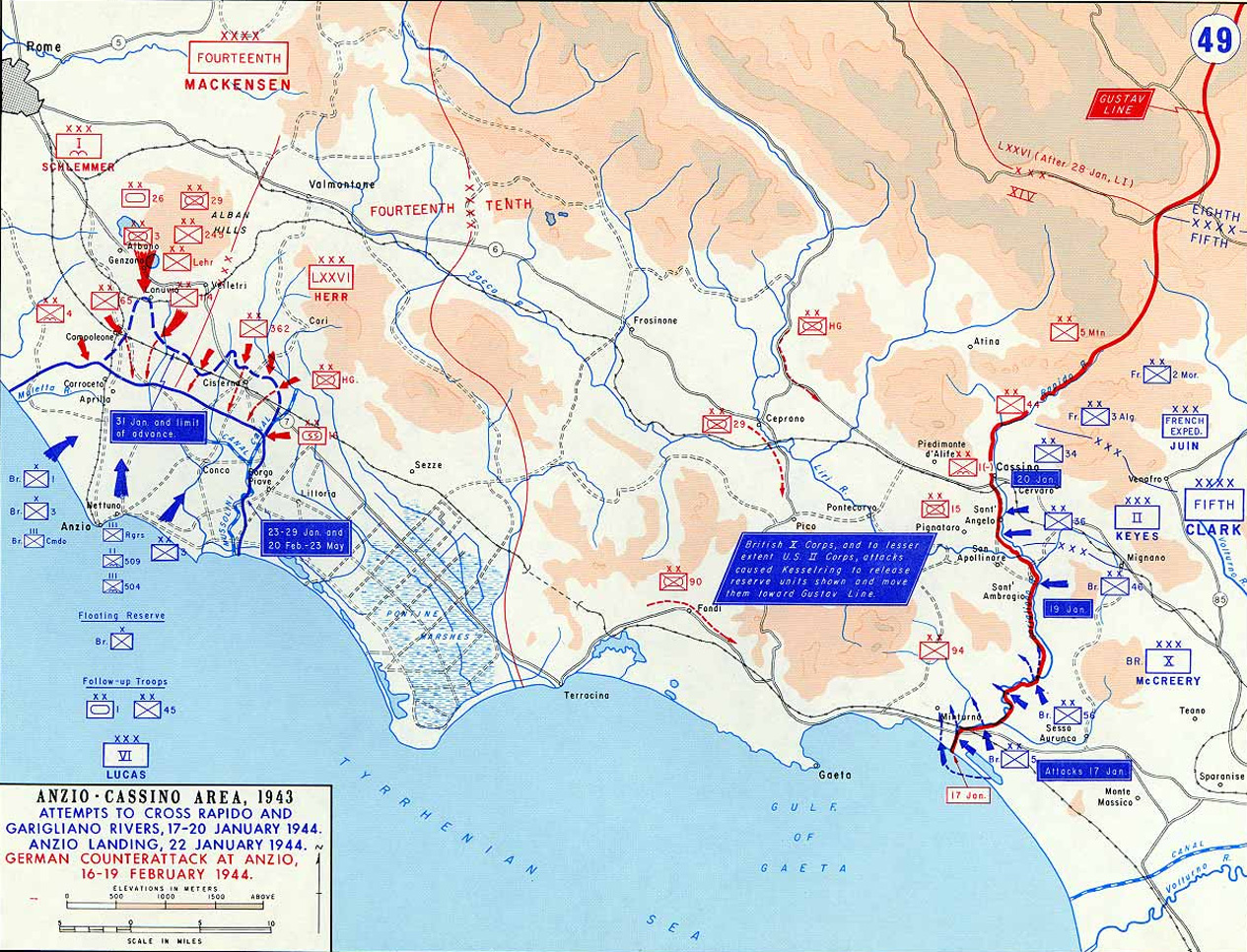
Force dispositions at Anzio and Cassino January / February 1944

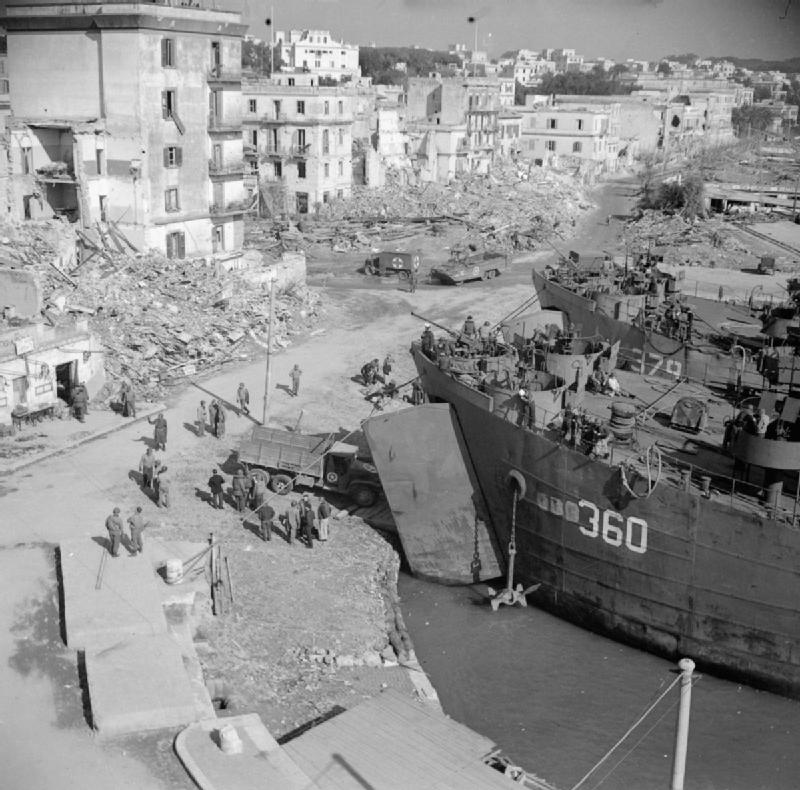
British landing ships unloading supplies in Anzio harbour, 19–24 February 1944

The landings began on 22 January 1944.

Although resistance had been expected, as seen at Salerno during 1943, the initial landings were essentially unopposed, with the exception of desultory Luftwaffe strafing runs.

By midnight, 36,000 soldiers and 3,200 vehicles had landed on the beaches. Thirteen Allied troops were killed, and 97 wounded; about 200 Germans had been taken as POWs. The British 1st Division penetrated 2 miles (3 km) inland, the Rangers captured Anzio's port, the 509th PIB captured Nettuno, and the US 3rd Division penetrated 3 miles (5 km) inland.

In the first days of operations, the command of the Italian resistance movement had a meeting with the Allied General Headquarters: it offered to guide the Allied Force through the Alban Hills territory, but the Allied Command refused the proposal.

=== After the landings ===
It is clear that Lucas' superiors expected some kind of offensive action from him. The point of the landing was to turn the German defences on the Winter Line, taking advantage of their exposed rear and hopefully panicking them into retreating northwards past Rome. However, Lucas instead poured more men and material into his tiny bridgehead, and strengthened his defences.

Churchill was clearly displeased with this action. He said: "I had hoped we were hurling a wildcat into the shore, but all we got was a stranded whale".

Lucas' decision remains a controversial one. Noted military historian John Keegan wrote, "Had Lucas risked rushing at Rome the first day, his spearheads would probably have arrived, though they would have soon been crushed. Nevertheless, he might have 'staked out claims well inland." However, "Lucas did not have confidence in the strategic planning of the operation. Also, he could certainly argue that his interpretation of his orders from Clark was not an unreasonable one. With two divisions landed, and facing two or three times that many Germans, it would have been reasonable for Lucas to consider the beachhead insecure." But according to Keegan, Lucas's actions "achieved the worst of both worlds, exposing his forces to risk without imposing any on the enemy."

=== Response of Axis forces ===
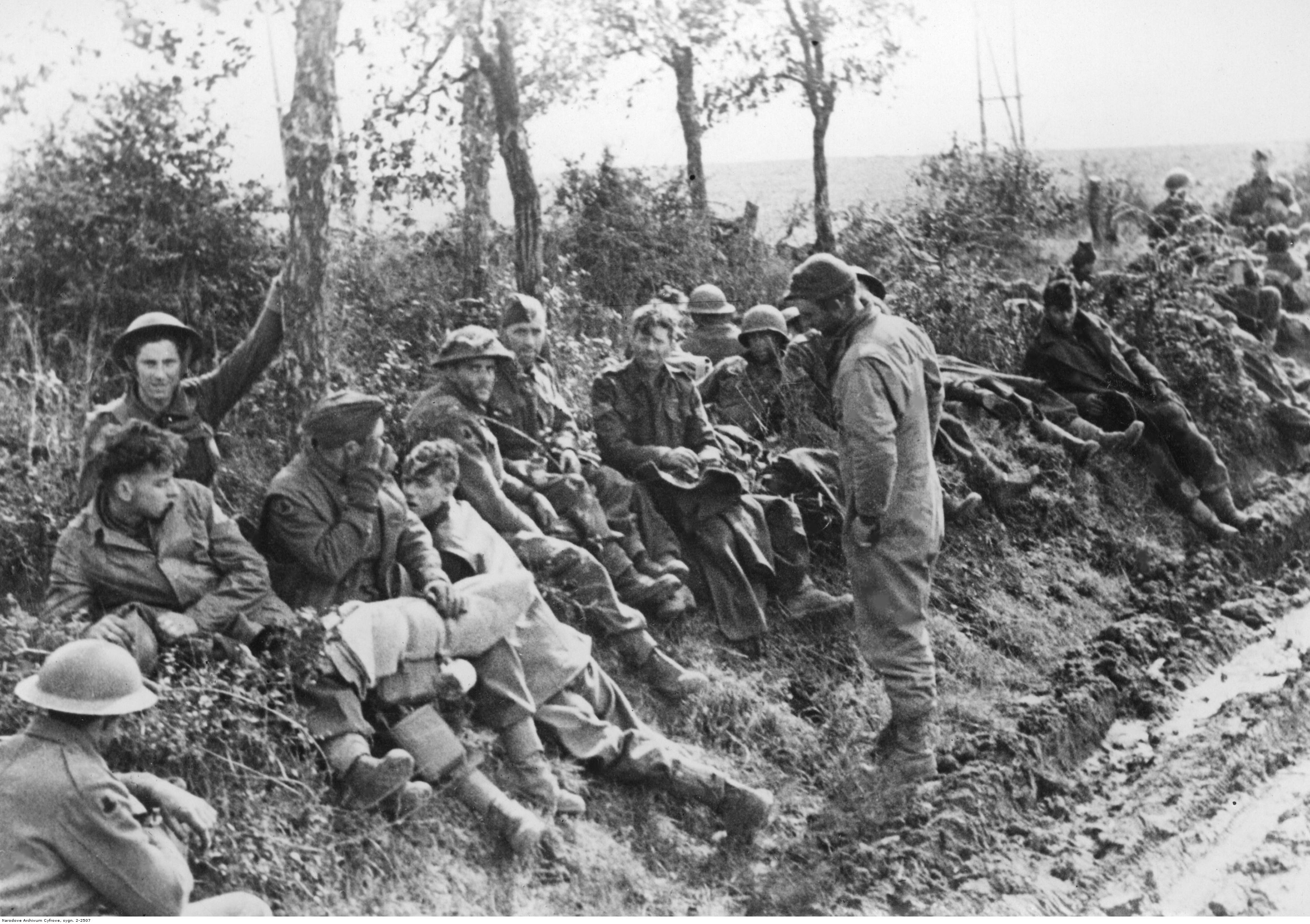
British and American POWs

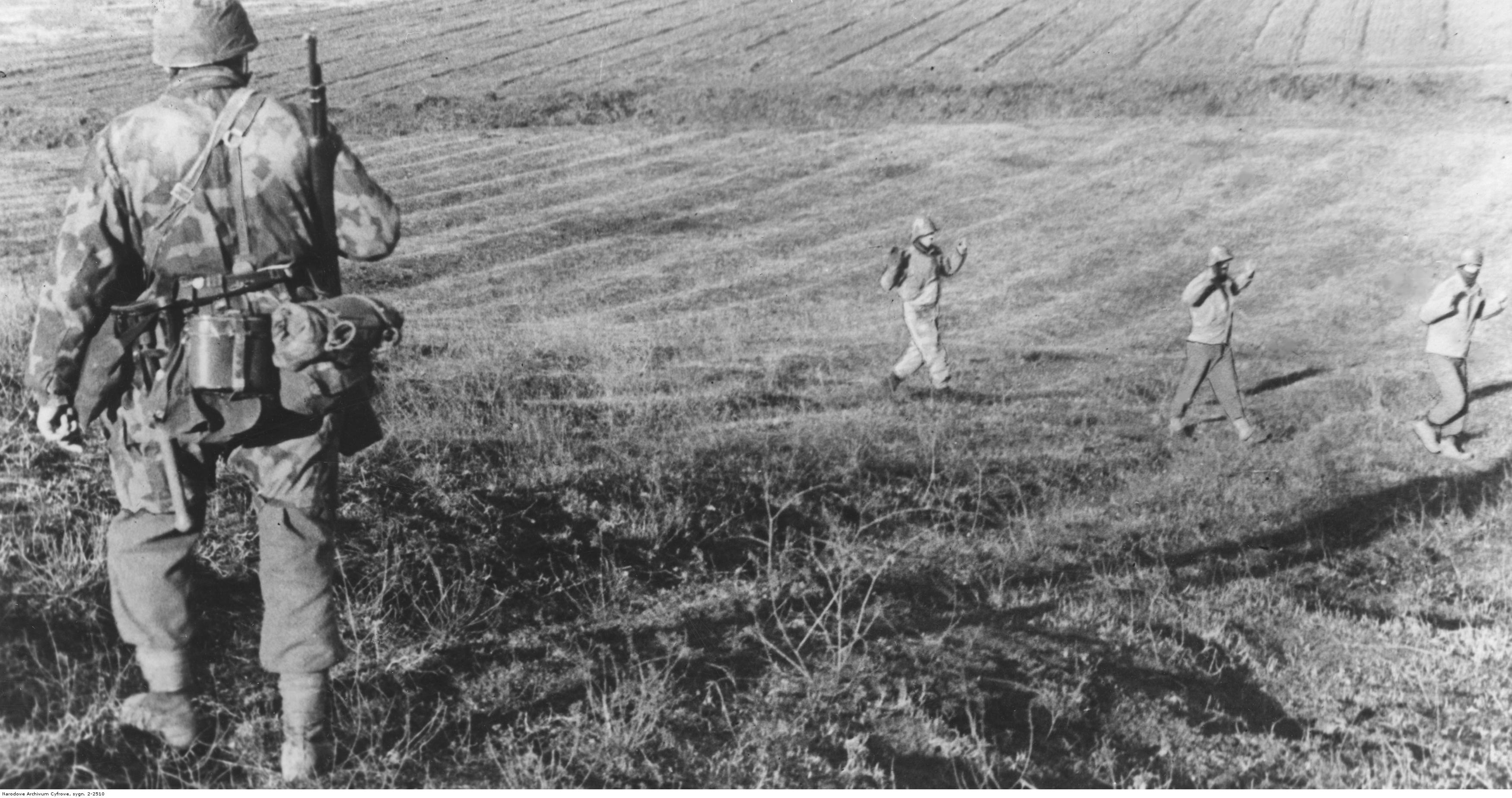
American POWs with arms raised on the Nettuno bridgehead. In the foreground, an armed German soldier.

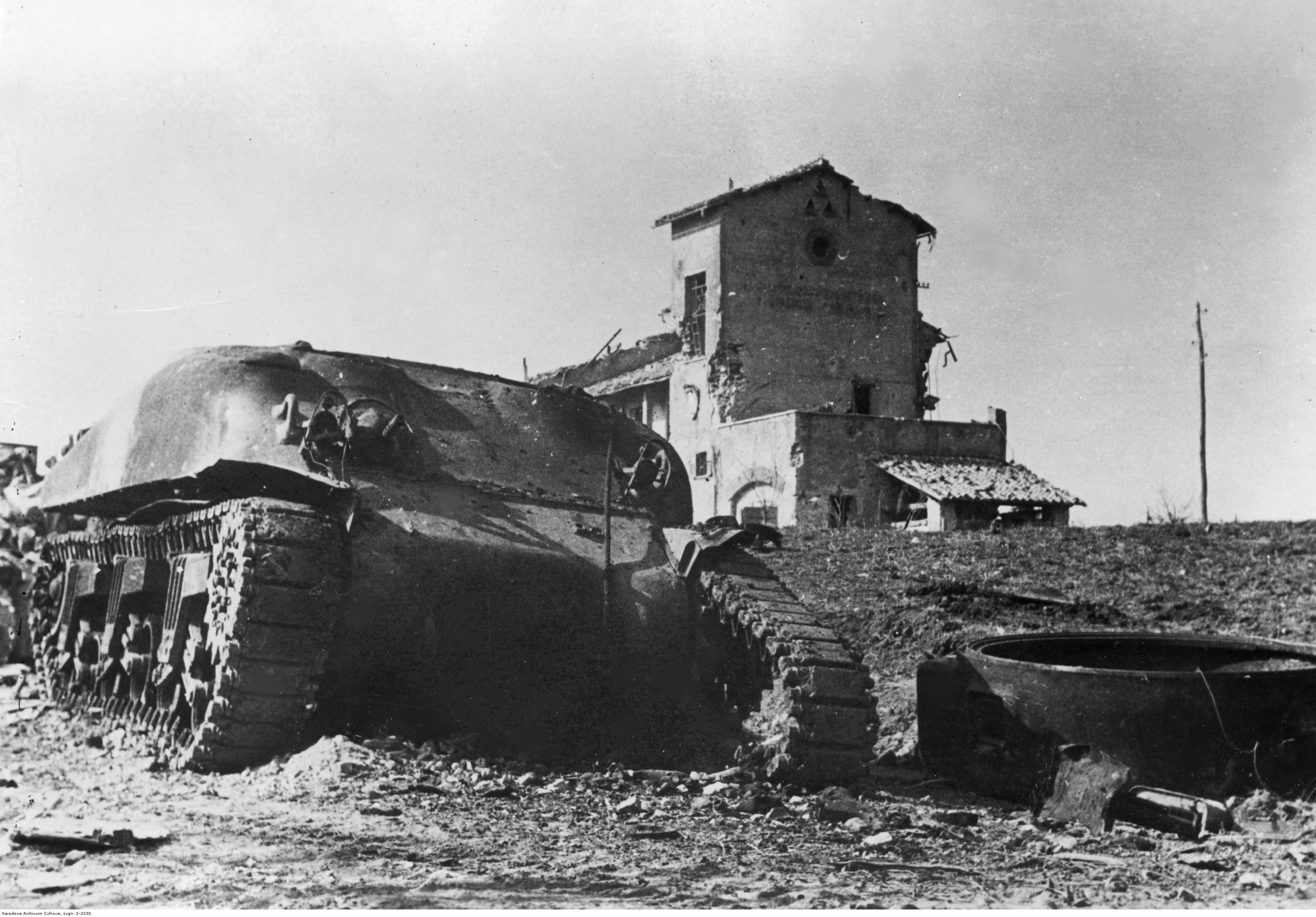
An M4 Sherman tank destroyed in the fighting

Kesselring was informed of the landings at 03:00 22 January. Although the landings came as a surprise, Kesselring had made contingency plans to deal with possible landings at all the likely locations. All the plans relied on his divisions each having previously organised a motorized rapid reaction unit (Kampfgruppe) which could move speedily to meet the threat and buy time for the rest of the defenses to get in place. At 05:00 he initiated Operation "Richard" and ordered the Kampfgruppe of 4th Parachute Division and the Hermann Göring Fallschirm Panzer Division to defend the roads leading from Anzio to the Alban Hills via Campoleone and Cisterna whilst his plans expected some 20,000 defending troops to have arrived by the end of the first day. In addition, he requested that OKW send reinforcements, and in response to this they ordered the equivalent of more than three divisions from France, Yugoslavia, and Germany whilst at the same time releasing to Kesselring a further three divisions in Italy which had been under OKW's direct command. Later that morning, he ordered General Eberhard von Mackensen (Fourteenth Army) and General Heinrich von Vietinghoff (Tenth Army – Gustav Line) to send him additional reinforcements.

The German units in the immediate vicinity had in fact been dispatched to reinforce the Gustav Line only a few days earlier. All available reserves from the southern front or on their way to it were rushed toward Anzio and Nettuno; these included the 3rd Panzer Grenadier and 71st Infantry Divisions, and the bulk of the Luftwaffe's Hermann Göring Panzer Division. Kesselring initially considered that a successful defence could not be made if the Allies launched a major attack on 23 January or 24 January. However, by the end of 22 January, the lack of aggressive action convinced him that a defence could be made. Nevertheless, few additional defenders arrived on 23 January, although the arrival on the evening of 22 January of Lieutenant General Alfred Schlemm and his 1st Parachute Corps headquarters brought greater organisation and purpose to the German defensive preparations. By 24 January, the Germans had over 40,000 troops in prepared defensive positions.

Three days after the landings, the beachhead was surrounded by a defence line consisting of three divisions: The 4th Parachute Division to the west, the 3rd Panzer Grenadier Division to the center in front of Alban Hills, the Hermann Göring Panzer Division to the east.

Von Mackensen's 14th Army assumed overall control of the defence on 25 January. Elements of eight German divisions were employed in the defence line around the beachhead, and five more divisions were on their way to the Anzio area. Kesselring ordered an attack on the beachhead for 28 January, though it was postponed to 1 February.

=== Liberty ship involvement ===
Liberty ships, which were never intended as warships, were involved in some fighting during the Battle of Anzio. On 22 to 30 January 1944 the SS Lawton B. Evans was under repeated bombardment from shore batteries and aircraft throughout an eight-day period. It endured a prolonged barrage of shrapnel, machine-gun fire and bombs. The gun crew fought back with shellfire and shot down five German planes.

=== Allied offensive ===
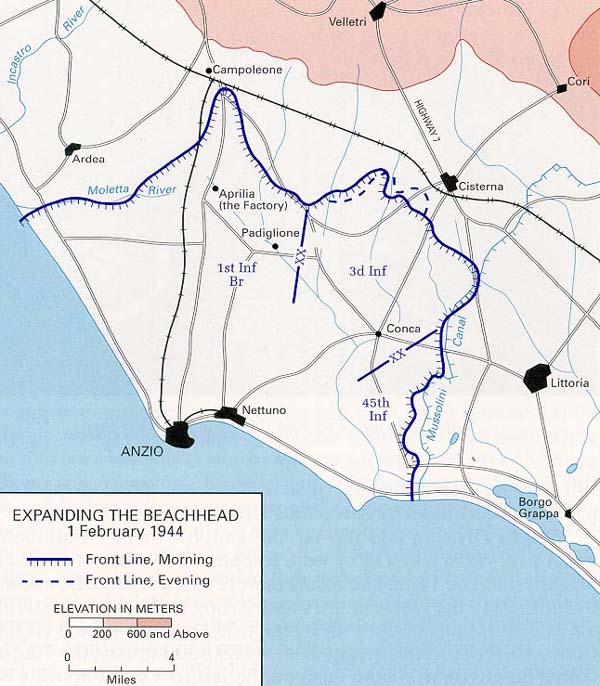
Allied force dispositions on 1 February 1944

Further troop movements including the arrival of U.S. 45th Infantry Division and U.S. 1st Armored Division, brought Allied forces total on the beachhead to 69,000 men, 508 guns and 208 tanks by 29 January, whilst the total defending Germans had risen to 71,500. Lucas initiated a two-pronged attack on 30 January. While one force was to cut Highway 7 at Cisterna di Latina before moving east into the Alban Hills, a second was to advance northeast up the Via Anziate towards Campoleone.

==== Battle of Campoleone ====
In heavy fighting British 1st Division made ground but failed to take Campoleone and ended the battle in an exposed salient stretching up the Via Anziate.

==== Battle of Cisterna ====
The main attack by the U.S. 3rd Division captured ground up to 3 miles (4.8 km) deep on a seven-mile wide front, but failed to break through or capture Cisterna. On the right, ahead of the main assault, two Ranger battalions made a daring covert advance towards Cisterna. Due to faulty intelligence, when daylight arrived they were engaged and cut off. A brutal battle with elements of the Fallschirm-Panzer Division 'Hermann Göring' followed and Rangers began surrendering. Of the 767 men in the 1st and 3rd Ranger Battalions, six returned to the Allied lines and 761 were killed or captured.

=== Axis counterattacks ===
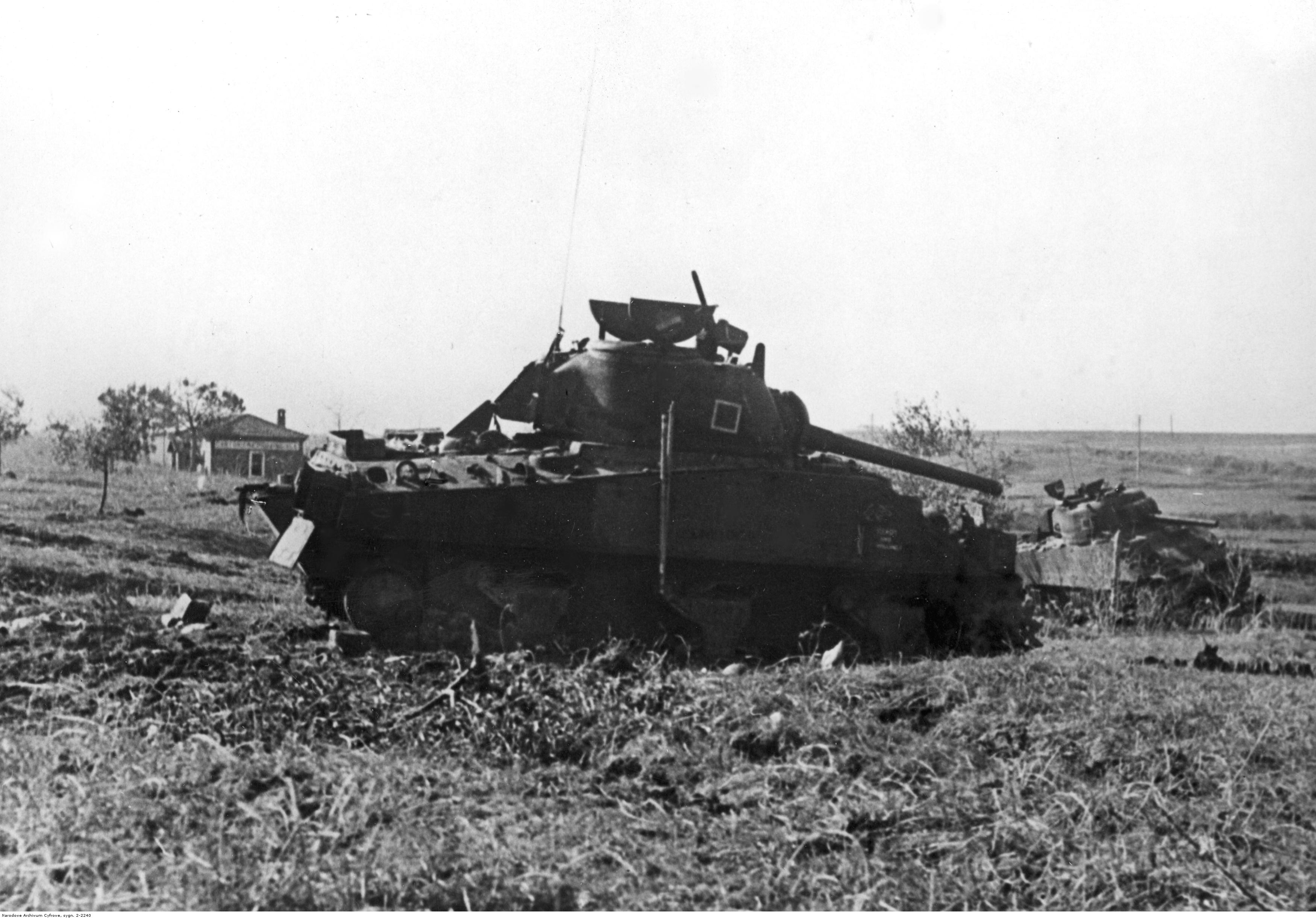
M4A2 Sherman tanks, knocked out near the commune of Aprilia.

By early February, German forces in Fourteenth Army numbered some 100,000 troops organised into two Army Corps, the 1st Parachute Corps under Schlemm and the LXXVI Panzer Corps under Lieutenant General Traugott Herr. Allied forces by this time totalled 76,400 (including the recently arrived British 56th Infantry Division, under Major-General Gerald Templer, which arrived complete on 16 February).

==== First Counterattack ====
After making exploratory probes on the Campoleone salient on the afternoon of February 3 the German forces launched a full counterattack at 23:00 in order to reduce the salient and "iron out" the front line. Von Mackensen had planned for the salient to be ground away rather than employing a rapid, focused thrust to cut it off. Some hours after the attack started the coherence of the front line had been completely shattered, and the fighting for the salient had given way to small unit actions, swaying back and forth through the gullies. In the morning of 4 February the situation was becoming more serious, with the 1st Battalion, Irish Guards (of 24th Guards Brigade), only having one cohesive rifle company left and on the opposite side of the salient, the 6th Battalion, Gordon Highlanders (of 2nd Brigade) was beginning to crumble and later lost three complete companies as prisoners.

Even though the base of the salient was nearly broken, Lucas was able to bolster the British 1st Division's defenses with the newly arrived 168th Brigade (from the 56th Division, containing 1st Battalion, London Irish Rifles, 1st Battalion, London Scottish, 10th Battalion, Royal Berkshire Regiment). The 3rd Brigade had been tasked with holding the tip of the salient 2 miles (3 km) long and 1,000 yards (900 m) wide on the road going north of Campoleone, but after the German attacks in the early hours of 4 February, the 2nd Battalion, Sherwood Foresters, 1st Battalion, King's Shropshire Light Infantry and 1st Battalion, Duke of Wellington's Regiment (all of 3rd Brigade) had been cut off and were surrounded in the pocket. They held the line all day, taking heavy casualties, but were eventually ordered to pull back and made a fighting retreat at 17:00 to the Factory with the aid of artillery, and a successful assault launched by the London Scottish, of 168th Brigade, supported by the 46th Royal Tank Regiment (46 RTR).

From 5 February to 7 February both sides employed heavy artillery concentrations and bombers to disrupt the other side and at 21:00 on 7 February the Germans renewed their attack. Once more the fighting was fierce and they managed to infiltrate between the 5th Battalion, Grenadier Guards (24th Guards Brigade) and the 2nd Battalion, North Staffordshire Regiment (2nd Brigade) and nearly surrounded them; it was for his leadership of British counterattacks during this period that Major William Sidney, a company commander in the 5th Grenadier Guards, was later awarded the Victoria Cross. Slowly the Allies were forced to give ground and by February 10 they had been pushed out of the salient. Lucas ordered attacks on 11 February to regain the lost ground but the Germans, forewarned by a radio intercept, repelled the Allies' poorly coordinated attack.

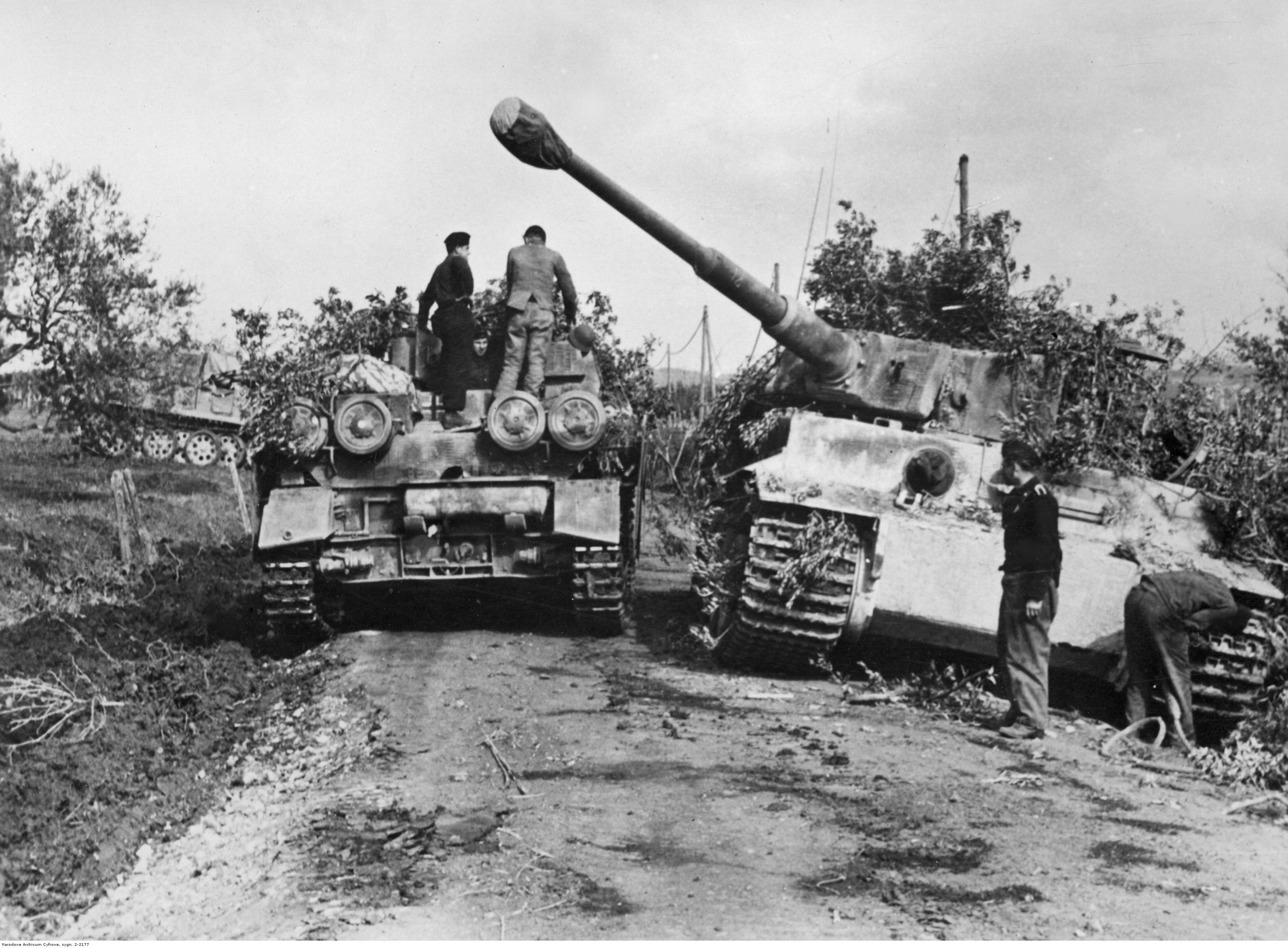
German armour at a field repair point operating near the Anzio-Nettuno front.

==== Operation Fischfang ====
On 16 February, the Germans launched a new offensive (Operation Fischfang) down the line of the Via Anziate, supported by Tiger tanks. They overran the 167th Brigade, of the recently arrived 56th (London) Division, and virtually destroyed X and Y Companies of the 8th Battalion, Royal Fusiliers, each of which was reduced from around 125 down to a single officer and 10 other ranks. One of the men killed was Second Lieutenant Eric Waters, whose son Roger Waters of Pink Floyd, created a song (When the Tigers Broke Free) in memory of his father and describes his death.

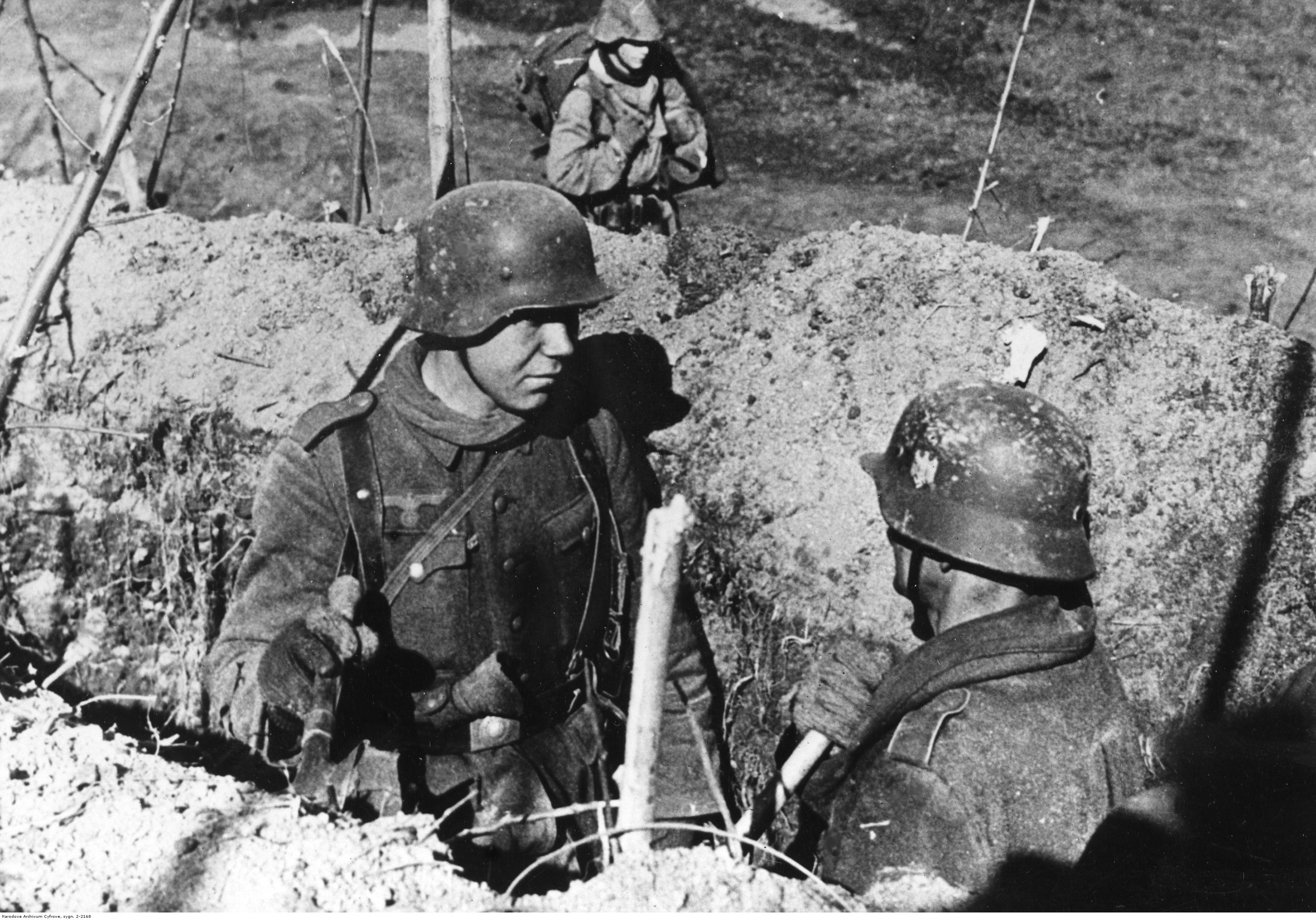
German troops occupy a trench network near the Aprilia sector in March.

By 18 February, after desperate fighting, the Allies' Final Beachhead Line (prepared defenses more or less on the line of the original beachhead) was under attack. Numerous attacks were launched on 1st Battalion, Loyal Regiment (2nd Brigade) and they lost a company, overrun, and the day after had suffered 200 casualties. On the same day Major-General Ronald Penney, General Officer Commanding (GOC) British 1st Division, had been wounded by shellfire and the division was temporarily commanded by Major-General Templer, GOC 56th (London) Division, which had arrived complete. However, a counterattack using VI Corps' reserves halted the German advance, and on 20 February, Fischfang petered out with both sides exhausted. An important contribution to stopping the German counterattack was the Allied artillery outshooting the German by a ratio of about ten to one, which had broken up attacks by hitting German assembly areas.

During Fischfang the Germans sustained some 5,400 casualties, the Allies 3,500. Both had suffered nearly 20,000 casualties each since the first landings, and it was "far the highest density of destruction in the Italian campaign, perhaps in the whole war".

Also on 18 February while returning to Anzio the light cruiser HMS Penelope was struck by two torpedoes and sunk with a loss of 417 men.

==== Further counterattacks ====
Despite the exhausted state of the troops, Hitler insisted that 14th Army should continue to attack. Despite the misgivings of both Kesselring and von Mackensen, a further assault was mounted on 29 February, this time on LXXVI Panzer Corps' front around Cisterna. This push achieved little except to generate a further 2,500 casualties for the 14th Army.

==== Involvement of Italian Social Republic units ====
Some Italian RSI units fought in the Anzio-Nettuno area, especially since March; the land units were part of the German 14th Army: only the paratroopers of the "Nembo" Battalion were there since February, participating in the German counterattack. In March the infantrymen of the "Barbarigo" Battalion (from Decima Flottiglia MAS under Captain Junio Valerio Borghese) joined the frontline along the Canale Mussolini.

=== Lucas replaced ===
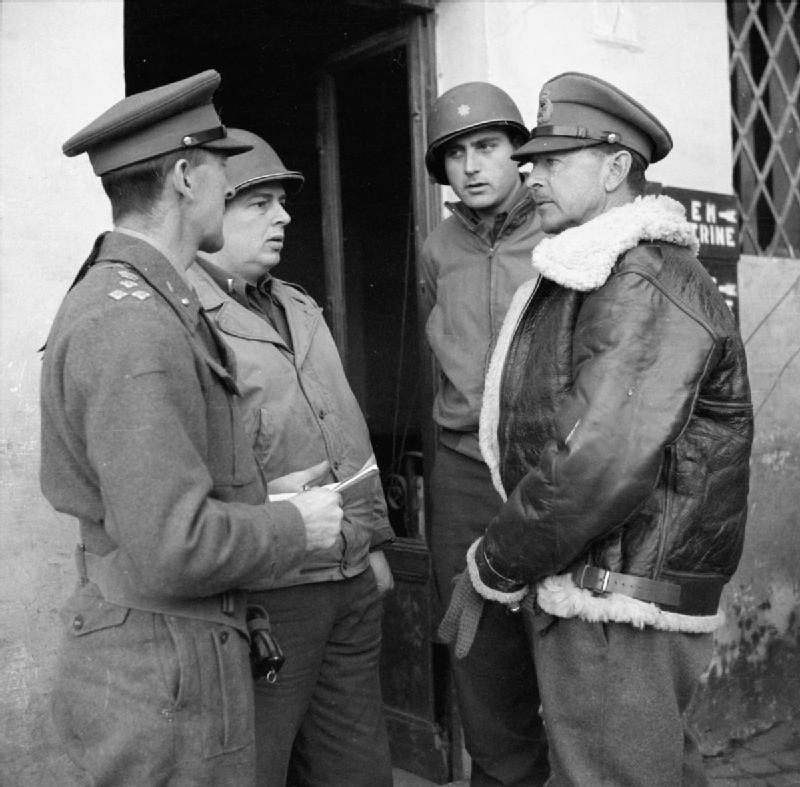
General Sir Harold Alexander (in flying jacket), commanding 15th Army Group, talks to American and British officers in Anzio, 14 February 1944.

Churchill had continued to bridle at Lucas' perceived passivity. He had written on 10 February to General Alexander encouraging him to exert his authority and Alexander had visited the beachhead on February 14 to tell Lucas he wished for a breakout as soon as the tactical situation allowed. After his visit Alexander wrote to the Chief of the Imperial General Staff, Alan Brooke, saying:

I am disappointed with VI Corps Headquarters. They are negative and lacking in the necessary drive and enthusiasm to get things done. They appeared to have become depressed by events.

Lucas wrote in his diary on 15 February:

I am afraid that the top side is not completely satisfied with my work... They are naturally disappointed that I failed to chase the Hun out of Italy but there was no military reason why I should have been able to do so. In fact there is no military reason for Shingle.

On 16 February at a high level conference hosted by Alexander and attended by Mark W. Clark and Henry Maitland Wilson, commander Allied Force Headquarters it was decided to appoint two deputies under Lucas, Truscott and the British Major-General Vyvyan Evelegh who were known to be more aggressive. On 22 February, Clark replaced Lucas with Truscott, appointing Lucas deputy commander Fifth Army until such time as a suitable job could be found for him back in the United States.

== Operation Diadem ==
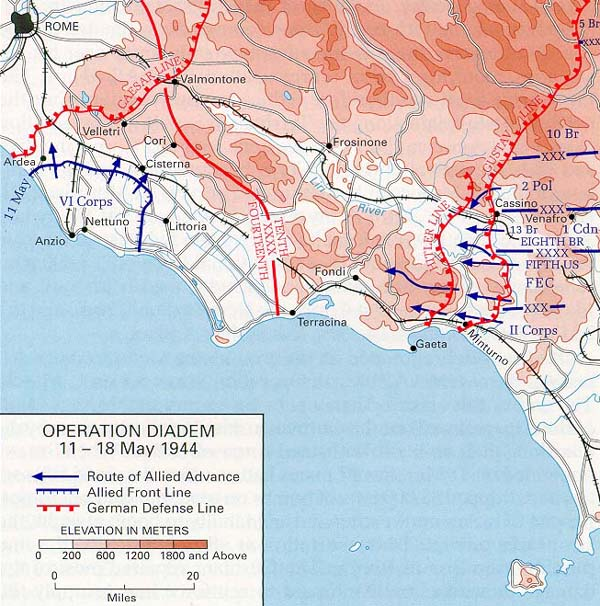
Allied plan of attack for Operation Diadem, May 1944

Both sides had realised that no decisive result could be achieved until the spring and reverted to a defensive posture involving aggressive patrolling and artillery duels whilst they worked to rebuild their fighting capabilities. In anticipation of the following spring, Kesselring ordered the preparation of a new defence line, the Caesar C line, behind the line of beachhead running from the mouth of the river Tiber just south of Rome through Albano, skirting south of the Alban Hills to Valmontone and across Italy to the Adriatic coast at Pescara, behind which 14th Army and, to their left, 10th Army might withdraw when the need arose.

Truscott, who had been promoted from the command of U.S. 3rd Infantry Division to replace Lucas as commander of VI Corps on 22 February, worked with his staff on the plans for an attack as part of a general offensive which Alexander was planning for May and which would include Operation Diadem, a big effort against the Gustav Line. The objective of the plan was fully to engage Kesselring's armies and remove any prospect of the Germans withdrawing forces from Italy. It was also intended to trap the bulk of the 10th Army between the Allied forces advancing through the Gustav Line and VI Corps thrusting inland from Anzio.

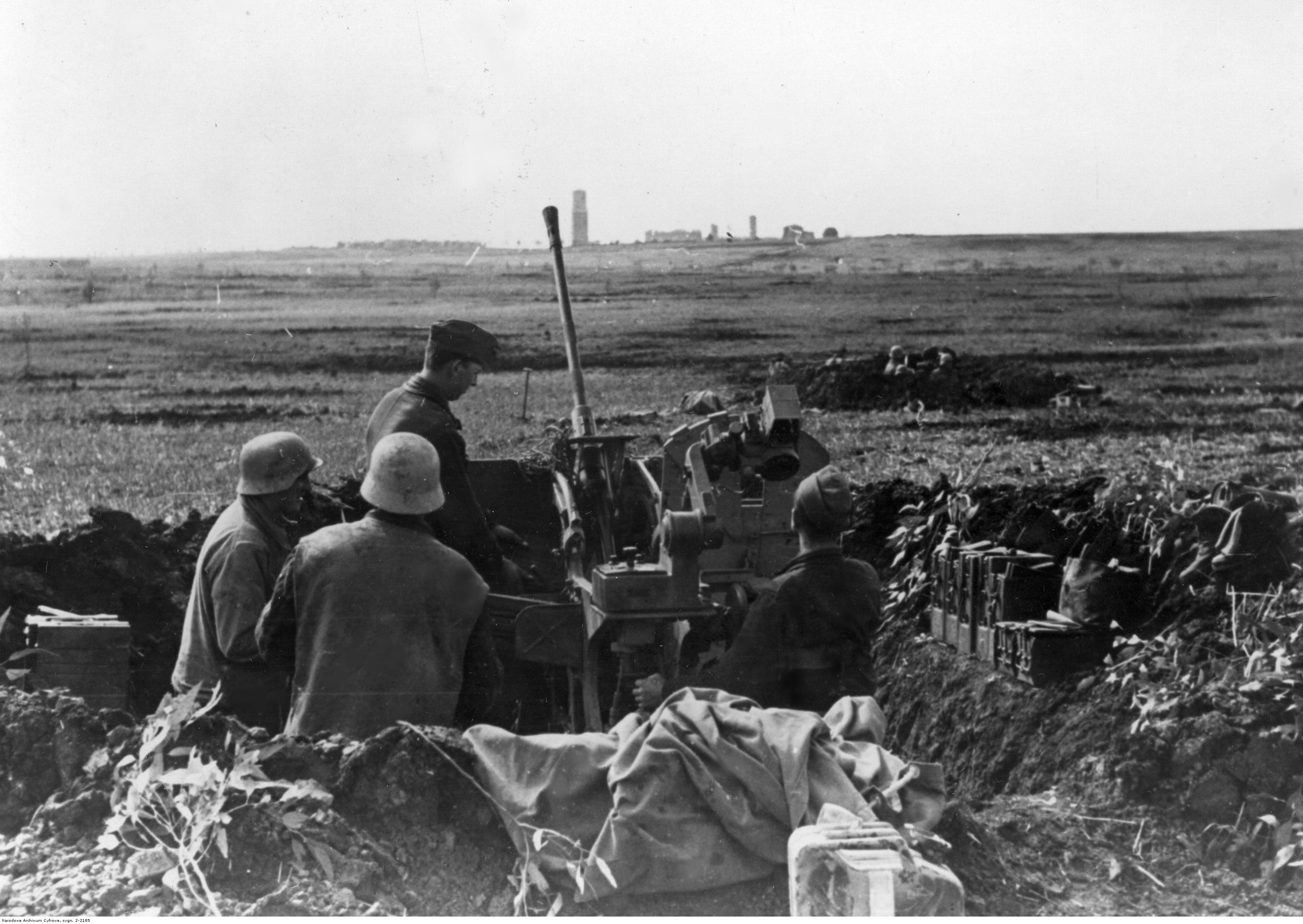
German 2 cm anti-aircraft FlaK cannon emplacement in the Aprilia sector of the front.

In March, the 2nd Italian SS "Vendetta" Battalion and 29th Italian SS Rifle Battalion were sent to fight against the Anglo-American forces at the Anzio beachhead. Dispersed among German battalions, the German commanding officers later gave the Italians companies favourable reports. Members of former Blackshirt Lieutenant-Colonel Degli Oddi's "Vendetta" helped defeat a determined effort by the U.S. 3rd Infantry Division to overrun their positions and captured a number of prisoners. Their performance at Anzio led to designation as units of the Waffen-SS, with all the duties and rights that entailed.

The next few weeks saw many changes in divisions on both sides. The U.S. 504th Parachute Infantry Regiment, which had fought with distinction but suffered many losses, was withdrawn to England on 23 March 1944. Also, in March the U.S. 34th Infantry Division and in early May, U.S. 36th Infantry Division, had arrived at Anzio. On the British side the 24th Guards Brigade of 1st Infantry Division was replaced in the first week of March by 18th Infantry Brigade (from the 1st Armoured Division in North Africa). The Guards Brigade had suffered devastating casualties (nearly 2,000 of an initial strength of over 2,500) in just less than two months at Anzio. In late March the 56th (London) Infantry Division had also been relieved, after suffering many casualties (the 7th Ox and Bucks of 167th (London) Brigade, had been reduced from 1,000 men to 60, by the 5th Infantry Division. By late May, there were some 150,000 Allied troops in the bridgehead, including five U.S. and two British divisions, facing five German divisions. The Germans were well dug in but were weak in numbers of officers and NCOs and, by the time of the late May offensive, lacked reserves (which had all been sent south to the Gustav line).

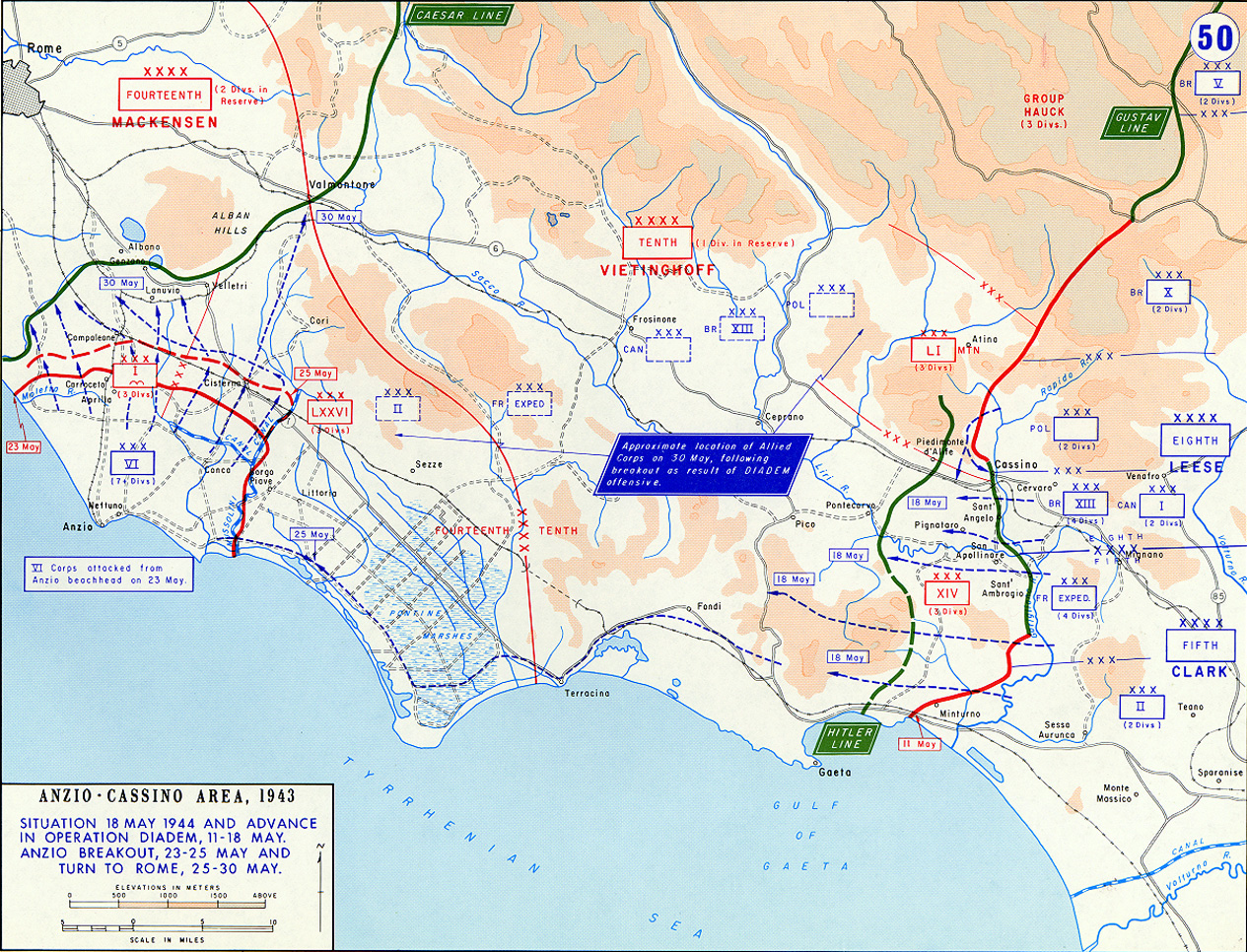
The Allied breakout from Anzio and advance from the Gustav Line May 1944

Despite Alexander's plan for Diadem requiring VI Corps to strike inland and cut Route 6, Clark asked Truscott to prepare alternatives and to be ready to switch from one to another at 48 hours' notice. Of the four scenarios prepared by Truscott, Operation Buffalo called for an attack through Cisterna, into the gap in the hills and to cut Route 6 at Valmontone. Operation Turtle was an attack to the left of the Alban Hills taking Campoleone, Albano and on to Rome. On 5 May, Alexander selected Buffalo and issued Clark with orders to this effect. Clark was determined that VI Corps should strike directly for Rome as evidenced in his later writing,

We not only wanted the honor of capturing Rome, but felt that we deserved it... Not only did we intend to become the first army to seize Rome from the south, but we intended to see that people at home knew that it was the Fifth Army that did the job, and knew the price that had been paid for it."

Clark put it to Alexander that VI Corps did not have the strength to trap the 10th Army and Alexander, instead of making his requirements clear, was conciliatory and gave the impression that a push on Rome was still a possibility if Buffalo ran into difficulties. On May 6, Clark informed Truscott that "..the capture of Rome is the only important objective and to be ready to execute Turtle as well as Buffalo".

Truscott's planning for Buffalo was meticulous, the 5th Infantry Division and the 1st Infantry Division on the left were to attack along the coast and up the Via Anziate to pin the 4th Parachute Division, 65th Infantry Division and the 3rd Panzergrenadier Division in place whilst the 45th Infantry Division, 1st Armored Division and 3rd Infantry Division would launch the main assault, engaging the German 362nd Infantry Division and the 715th Infantry Division and striking towards Campoleone, Velletri and Cisterna respectively. On the Allies' far right, the 1st Special Service Force would protect the American southern flank.

== Breakout ==
At 05:45 on 23 May 1944, 1,500 Allied artillery pieces commenced bombardment. Forty minutes later the guns paused as attacks were made by close air support and then resumed as the infantry and armour moved forward. The first day's fighting was intense: the 1st Armored Division lost 100 tanks and 3rd Infantry Division suffered 955 casualties. The Germans suffered too, with the 362nd Infantry Division estimated to have lost 50% of its fighting strength.

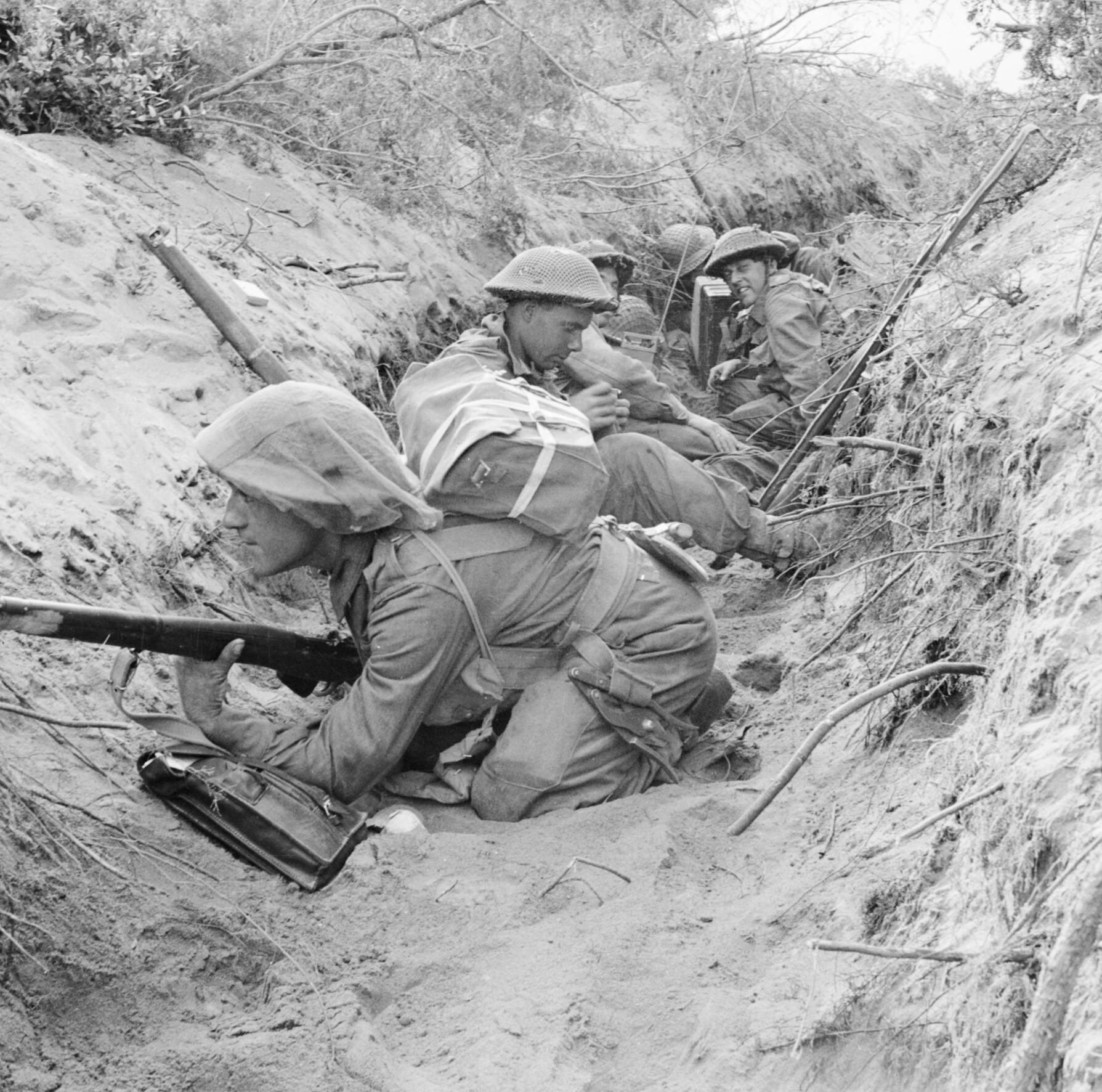
Men of 'D' Company, 1st Battalion, Green Howards, part of 15th Brigade of the 5th Infantry Division, occupy a captured German communications trench during the breakout at Anzio, Italy, 22 May 1944.

Mackensen had been convinced that the Allies' main thrust would be up the Via Anziate, and the ferocity of the British feint on 23 and 24 May did nothing to persuade him otherwise. Kesselring was convinced that the Allies' intentions were to gain Route 6 and ordered the Hermann Göring Panzer Division, resting 150 miles (240 km) away at Livorno, (Note: Livorno is referred to as "Leghorn" in contemporary Allied maps and documents.) to Valmontone to hold open Route 6 for the 10th Army, which was retreating up this road from Cassino.

In the afternoon of 25 May, Cisterna finally fell to the 3rd Infantry Division, who had to go from house to house winkling out the German 362nd Infantry Division, which had refused to withdraw and, as a consequence, had virtually ceased to exist by the end of the day. By the end of 25 May, the 3rd Infantry Division was heading into the Velletri gap near Cori, and elements of the 1st Armoured Division was within 3 mi (4.8 km) of Valmontone and were in contact with units of the Hermann Göring Division which were just starting to arrive from Leghorn. Although VI Corps had suffered over 3,300 casualties in the three days fighting, Operation Buffalo was going to plan, and Truscott was confident that a concerted attack by the 1st Armoured Division and the 3rd Infantry Division the next day would get his troops astride Route 6.

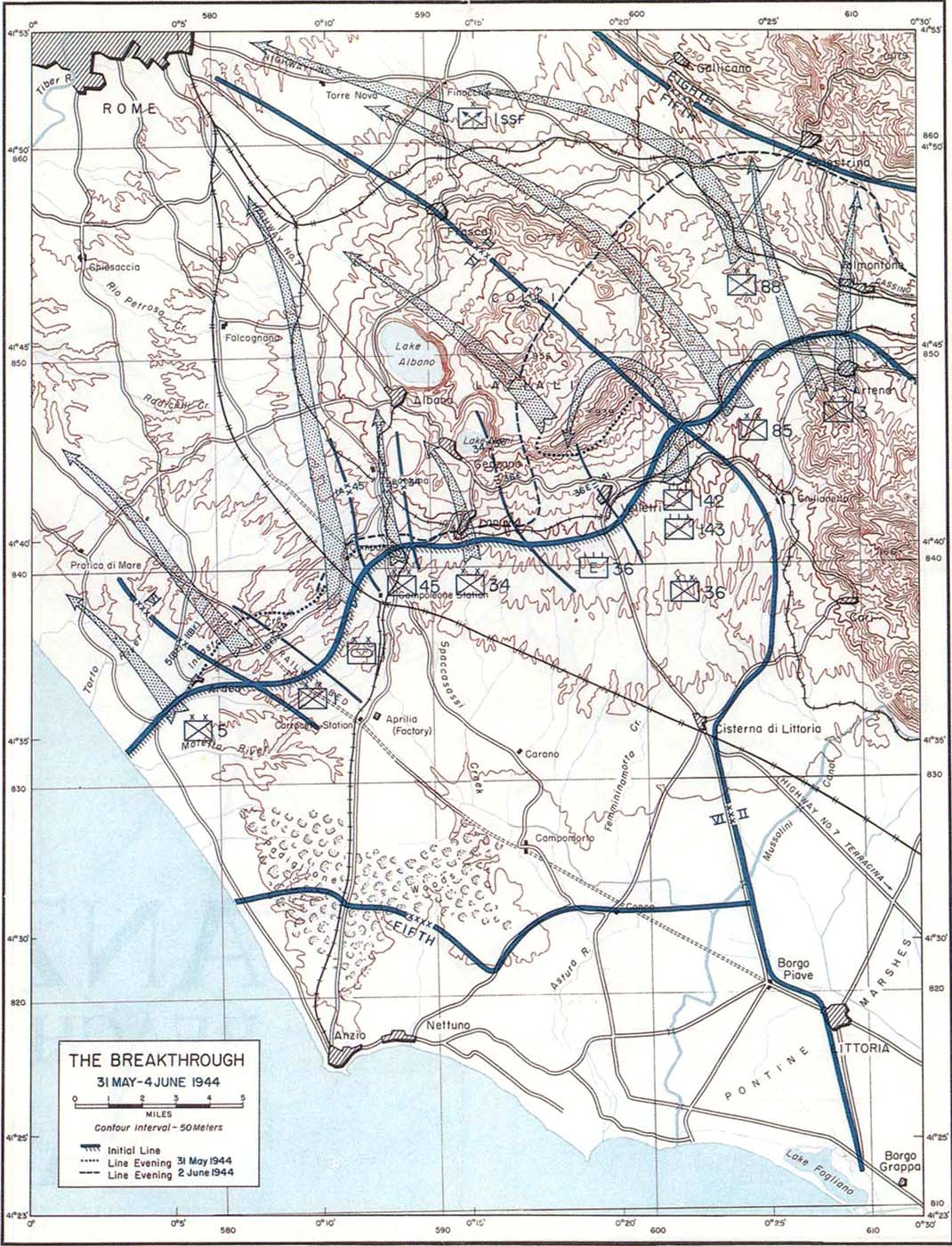
The final move on Rome

On the evening of 25 May, Truscott received new orders from Clark via his Operations Officer, Brigadier general Don Brand. These were, in effect, to implement Operation Turtle and turn the main line of attack 90 degrees to the left. Most importantly, although the attack towards Valmontone and Route 6 would continue, the 1st Armoured Division was to withdraw to prepare to exploit the planned breakthrough along the new line of attack leaving the 3rd Infantry Division to continue towards Valmontone with the 1st Special Service Force in support. Clark informed Alexander of these developments late in the morning of 26 May by which time the change of orders was a fait accompli.

At the time, Truscott was shocked, writing later,

...I was dumbfounded. This was no time to drive to the north-west where the enemy was still strong; we should pour our maximum power into the Valmontone Gap to ensure the destruction of the retreating German Army. I would not comply with the order without first talking to General Clark in person. ... [However] he was not on the beachhead and could not be reached even by radio... such was the order that turned the main effort of the beachhead forces from the Valmontone Gap and prevented destruction of the German Tenth Army. On the 26th the order was put into effect.

He went on to write,

There has never been any doubt in my mind that had General Clark held loyally to General Alexander's instructions, had he not changed the direction of my attack to the north-west on 26 May, the strategic objectives of Anzio would have been accomplished in full. To be first in Rome was a poor compensation for this lost opportunity.

On 26 May, while VI Corps was initiating its difficult maneuver, Kesselring threw elements of four divisions into the Velletri gap to stall the advance on Route 6. For four days they fought against the 3rd Infantry Division until finally withdrawing on 30 May, having kept Route 6 open and allowed seven divisions from the 10th Army to withdraw and head north of Rome.

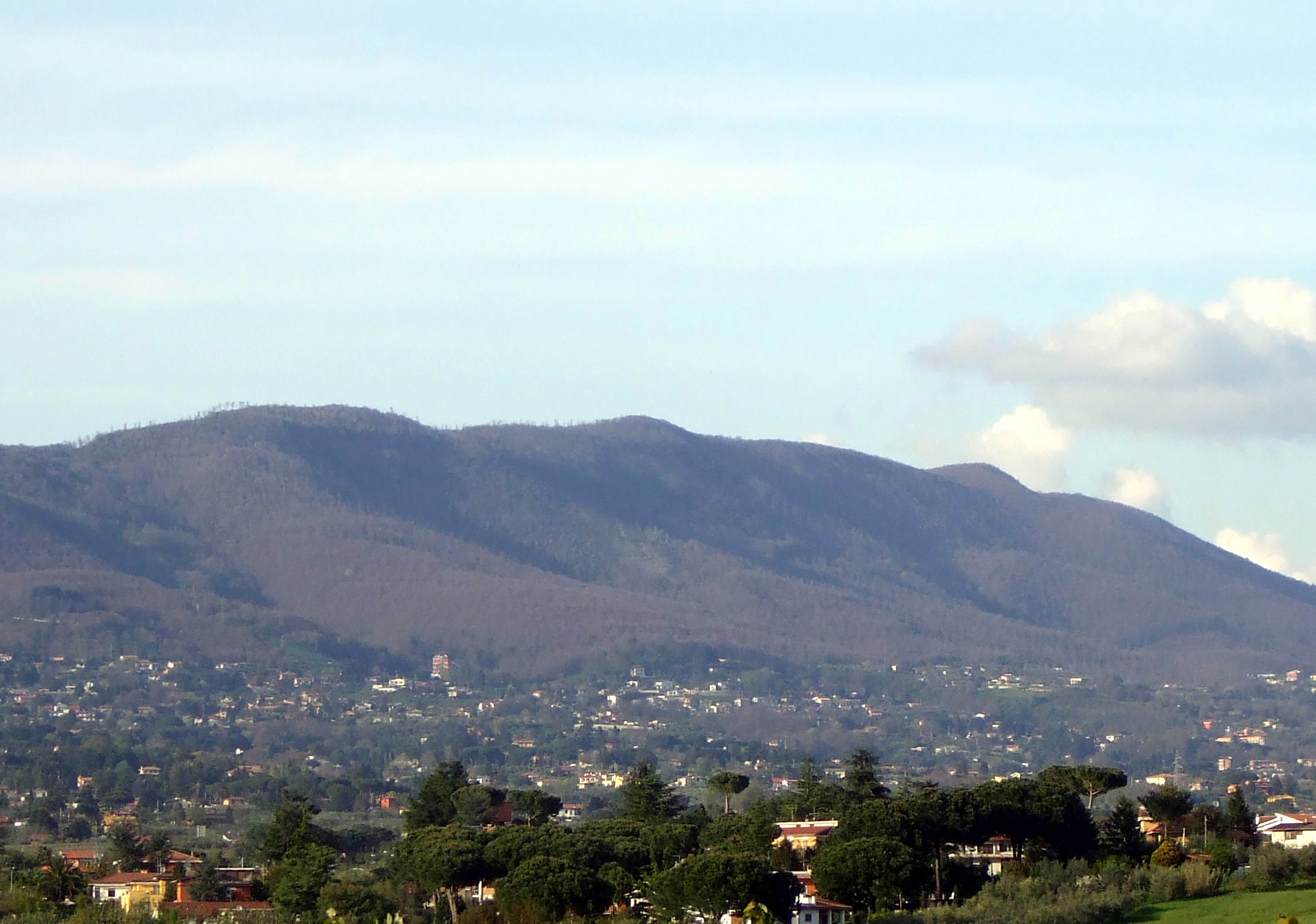
Monte Artemisio (812 m) with two peaks: Monte Peschio (939 m) and Maschio d'Ariano (891 m)

On the new axis of attack little progress was made until the 1st Armored Division was in position on 29 May, when the front advanced to the main Caesar C Line defences. A quick breakthrough seemed unlikely until on 30 May, 36th Division (Major general Fred L. Walker) found a gap in the Caesar Line at the join between the 1st Parachute Corps and LXXVI Panzer Corps. Climbing the steep slopes of Monte Artemisio they threatened Velletri from the rear and obliged the defenders to withdraw. This was a turning point and Mackensen offered his resignation, which Kesselring accepted.

Clark assigned U.S. II Corps which, fighting its way along the coast from the Gustav Line, had joined up with VI Corps on May 25 to attack around the right-hand side of the Alban Hills and advance along the line of Route 6 to Rome. On 2 June the Caesar Line collapsed under the mounting pressure, and 14th Army commenced a fighting withdrawal through Rome. On the same day Hitler, fearing another Stalingrad, had ordered Kesselring that there should be "no defence of Rome". Over the next day, the rearguards were gradually overwhelmed and Rome was entered in the early hours of 4 June with Clark holding an impromptu press conference on the steps of the Town Hall on the Capitoline Hill that morning. He ensured the event was a strictly American affair by stationing military police at road junctions to refuse entry to the city by British troops.

== Aftermath ==
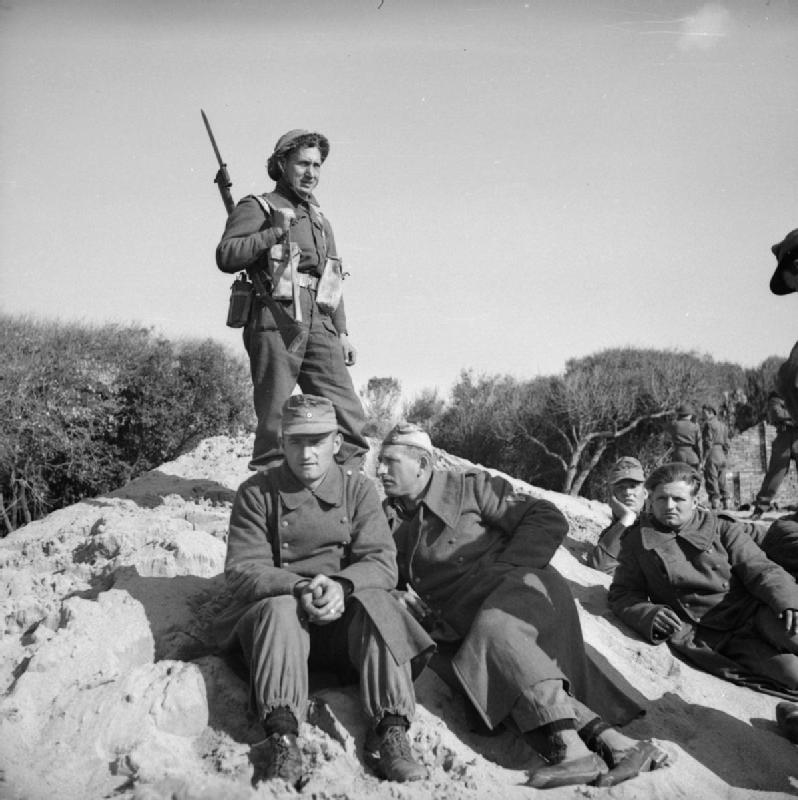
A British soldier guards a group of German prisoners at Anzio, Italy, 22 January 1944.

Although controversy continues regarding what might have happened if Lucas had been more aggressive from the start, most commentators agree that the initial plan for Anzio was flawed. They question whether the initial landing of just over two infantry divisions, with no supporting armour, had the strength to achieve the objectives: of cutting Route 6 and then holding off the inevitable counterattacks that would come, as Kesselring redeployed his forces.

Volume 5 of Churchill's The Second World War is riddled with implied criticism of Lucas, blaming the failure on his caution. After the war, Kesselring gave his evaluation:

It would have been the Anglo-American doom to overextend themselves. The landing force was initially weak, only a division or so of infantry, and without armour. It was a halfway measure of an offensive; that was your basic error.

Alexander, in his Official Dispatch, stated, "The actual course of events was probably the most advantageous in the end."

Churchill defended the operation and believed that sufficient forces were available. He had clearly made great political efforts to procure certain resources, especially the extra LSTs needed to deliver a second division to shore, but also specific units useful to the attack such as with the 504th Parachute Infantry Regiment. He argued that even regardless of the tactical outcome of the operation, there was immediate strategic benefit with regard to the wider war. After the landings, the German High Command dropped its plans to transfer five of Kesselring's best divisions to Northwestern Europe. This benefited the upcoming Operation Overlord. Churchill also had to ensure the British-dominated forces in Italy were contributing to the war at a time when the Soviet Red Army were suffering tremendous losses on the Eastern Front.

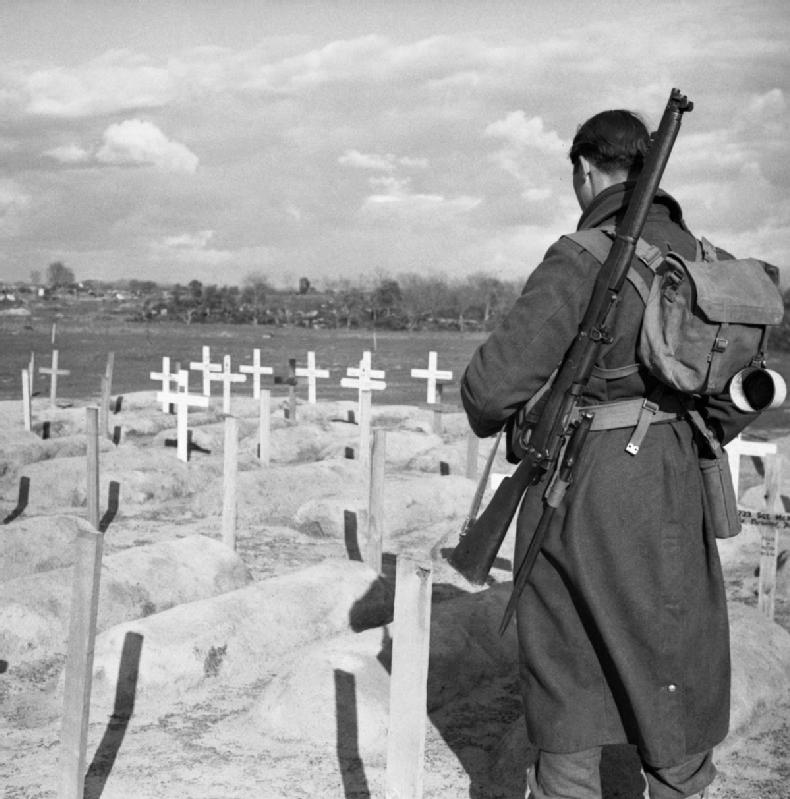
Private Phillip Johnson of the 2/6th Battalion, Queen's Royal Regiment (West Surrey), inspects British graves at Anzio, Italy, 1 March 1944.

Because of Clark's change of plan, Diadem (during which the U.S. Fifth Army and the Eighth Army suffered 44,000 casualties) failed in its objective of destroying the 10th Army. It also condemned the Allies to another year of fighting in Italy, notably around the Gothic Line from August 1944 through March 1945.

The greatest loss was that if the VI Corps main effort had continued on the Valmontone axis from 26 May, Clark could probably have reached Rome more quickly than by the route north-west from Cisterna. VI Corps could also have cut Highway 6 and then put much more pressure on the 10th Army than it actually did.

Alan Whicker, who was a war correspondent with the British Army's Film and Photo Unit and was present during the fighting, later said,

After breaking out of Anzio, Alexander's plan was for the Fifth Army to drive east to cut Kesselring's escape route to the north and trap much of his Tenth and Fourteenth Armies. The operation started well, but then suddenly, when leading troops were only six kilometers from closing their trap at Frosinone, the Fifth Army was re-directed and sent north towards Rome. The trap was left open. General Mark Clark was so eager that the world should see pictures showing him as the liberator of Rome, that he allowed the armies of a delighted Kesselring to escape.

He had ignored the orders of Field Marshall Alexander in a decision as militarily stupid as it was insubordinate.

This, vain-glorious blunder, the worst of the entire war, lost us a stunning victory, lengthened the war by many months and earned Mark Clark the contempt of other American and British generals. They saw an operation that could have won the war in Italy, thrown away at the cost of many Allied lives, because of the obsession and vanity of one man.

If General Mark Clark had been in the German Army, Hitler would have had him shot.

— Alan Whicker

The news cycle was similarly unkind to Clark. Two days after his staged press conference on Rome's Capitolium, the "advance" was relegated to the back pages as reporting on the Normandy landings took center stage June 6.

== Notable participants ==
- Ellen Ainsworth, killed during the battle while serving with 56th Evacuation Hospital, was one of four nurses serving at the time - the others being Mary Roberts, Rita Rourke, and Elaine Roe - who were the first women to be awarded the Silver Star; all of them were cited for their bravery in evacuating the 33rd Field Hospital at Anzio on 10 February 1944.
- James Arness, actor best known for portraying Marshal Matt Dillon on the television series Gunsmoke. Arness served with the 3rd Infantry Division during World War II and was severely wounded on the frontline of Anzio, leading to a lifelong of slight limp.
- James Chichester-Clark, a newly commissioned officer serving in the 1st Battalion, Irish Guards of 24th Guards Brigade of British 1st Infantry Division, who was later the fifth Prime Minister of Northern Ireland and eighth leader of the Ulster Unionist Party.
- Chester Cruikshank, twice United States hammer throw champion, received the Distinguished Service Cross for his actions in the Anzio-Nettuno area.
- George Gaynes, actor and singer, was on the destroyer HMS Wilton.
- Denis Healey, later a Labour Party Defence Minister and Chancellor of the Exchequer, was the Military Landing Officer for the British assault brigade at Anzio.
- Hamish Henderson, noted Scottish communist and folklorist, was an intelligence officer at Anzio, where he interrogated German prisoners. It was at Anzio that he heard the tune "The Bloody Fields of Flanders", to which he later set alternative Scottish national and internationalist anthem "Freedom Come-All-Ye".
- Daniel Inouye, Medal of Honor recipient and later, the first Japanese-American U.S. Senator, eventually becoming the president pro tempore of the Senate. Served with the segregated 442nd Regimental Combat Team.
- Young-Oak Kim, a Korean-American who served with the segregated Japanese-American 442nd Regimental Combat Team. He would go on to become the first officer of any minority to command a battalion in combat in U.S. History during the Korean War, and one of the most highly decorated Asian Americans.
- Christopher Lee, British actor, participated in this battle with the No. 260 Squadron RAF.
- Bill Mauldin, noted cartoonist, creator of Willie and Joe, who appeared in the American Army newspaper Stars and Stripes, was in the Anzio-Nettuno area, serving with the 45th Infantry Division.
- Audie Murphy, Hollywood actor. Murphy became the most decorated United States combat soldier in United States military history. He received the Medal of Honor, the U.S. military's highest award for valor, along with 32 additional U.S. medals. He served with Company B, 1st Battalion, 15th Infantry Regiment, 3rd Infantry Division.
- Tommy Prince, a scout with the First Special Service Force, disguised himself as an Italian farmer and, walking close to German positions, repaired telephone lines, allowing him to send messages to Allied artillery, and target and destroy four German gun batteries.
- Ernie Pyle, a Pulitzer Prize–winning American journalist and war correspondent who is best known for his stories about ordinary American soldiers during World War, was at Anzio Beachhead, with his time there being documented in his book Brave Men published in 1944.
- Frank Sheeran, an American labor union official and associate of Jimmy Hoffa, served 411 days in World War II, including the Battle of Anzio.
- William Sidney, awarded the Victoria Cross for actions as a Major with the 5th Battalion, Grenadier Guards in the Anzio beachhead. Sidney's father-in-law, Lord Gort, also had been awarded the Victoria Cross in the First World War.
- Felix Sparks, a commander of the 157th Infantry's 3rd Battalion, which he later led during its participation in the liberation of the Dachau concentration camp. Later an associate justice in the Colorado supreme court.
- Raleigh Trevelyan, attached to the Green Howards, was twice wounded. After the war he wrote The Fortress: A Diary of Anzio and After.
- Wynford Vaughan-Thomas, a British journalist, reported on the battle for the BBC. He later wrote a book on the battle, on which the 1968 film was based.
- John William Vessey Jr., the tenth Chairman of the Joint Chiefs of Staff. He was member of the 34th Infantry Division, and during the Battle of Anzio, he received a battlefield commission from first sergeant to second lieutenant.
- Eric Fletcher Waters, father of Pink Floyd bassist Roger Waters and a 2nd Lieutenant with the Royal Fusiliers, died at Anzio. Waters's death and the battle inspired his son to write several songs over his career, including "When the Tigers Broke Free" for the band's 1982 film, Pink Floyd – The Wall.
- Alan Whicker, a BBC reporter, was at Anzio as a member of the British Army Film and Photo Unit. His 2004 documentary Whicker's War describes his experiences there.
- William Woodruff, writer and historian, was a Major in the 24th Guards Brigade of the British 1st Infantry Division at Anzio. His book Vessel of Sadness is based on his experience of the battle.
- Alec MacKelden, Lieutenant, Buffs (Royal East Kent Regiment), commanded a platoon during the Anzio campaign and subsequently at the Gothic Line, later awarded the Military Cross for gallantry during operations in April–May 1945.
