= Ellen Ainsworth =

United States Army officer

Ellen Ainsworth (1918 in Glenwood City, Wisconsin – 1944 in Anzio, Italy) was an officer in the United States Army during World War II. Ainsworth was awarded the Silver Star and the Purple Heart for her actions during Operation Shingle while serving with the United States Army Nurse Corps. She and three of her fellow nurses serving at the time - Mary Roberts, Rita Rourke, and Elaine Roe - were the first women to be awarded the Silver Star; all of them were cited for their bravery in evacuating the 33rd Field Hospital at Anzio on 10 February 1944.

Ainsworth was killed during the Battle of Anzio while serving with 56th Evacuation Hospital, and was the only Wisconsin woman killed by enemy fire during World War II. After her death she was buried in the Sicily–Rome American Cemetery and Memorial.

== Early life and education ==
Ainsworth was the youngest of three siblings, and grew up in Glenwood, Wisconsin. She attended the Eitel Hospital School of Nursing in Minneapolis. After graduating in 1941, she joined the United States Army Nurse Corps in March 1942.

== Legacy ==
Subsequent memorials to her include a conference room named in her honor at The Pentagon and a dispensary named in her honor at Fort Hamilton. A post office in Glenwood City, Wisconsin is designated a memorial post office in her honor by Congress.
