= Ainsworth =

Ainsworth may refer to:

== Places ==
Canada

- Ainsworth Hot Springs, British Columbia

United Kingdom

- Ainsworth, Greater Manchester, England

United States

- Ainsworth, Indiana
- Ainsworth, Iowa
- Ainsworth, Nebraska
- Ainsworth, Wisconsin
- Ainsworth, Washington, ghost town
- Ainsworth State Park, Oregon

== People ==
- Ainsworth (surname)

== Ships ==
- City of Ainsworth, a pioneer sternwheeler from British Columbia; its deep-water wreck is a heritage site
- USS Ainsworth, a retired Knox-class frigate

== Other uses ==
- Ainsworth baronets
