= John Ainsworth (MP for Worcester) =

English politician

John Ainsworth (by 1523 – 1558 or 1559), of Pershore and Worcester, was an English politician.

== Biography ==
Educated in Cambridge by 1522, obtained BA degree in 1526/1527. He held the offices of Member of the Twenty-Four, Worcester in 1544, auditor in 1547–1548, 1553–1554, chamberlain 1548–1549. Ainsworth may have promoted the Act setting aside a seven-year apprenticeship for clothiers in Worcester and other towns.

Ainsworth was a Member of Parliament for Worcester in April 1554.
