= Leonora Ainsworth =

American screenwriter

- Born: Cornelia Leonora Ainsworth; June 12, 1871; Castleton Township, Michigan; United States
- Died: September 8, 1939 (aged 68); Los Angeles, California; United States
- Occupation: Screenwriter
- Years active: 1912-1917
- Spouses: Walter I. Towne (m. 1892; div. 1905) William Dowlan (m. 1906)
- Children: 1 daughter (Harriet Towne, later Harriet Dowlan)

Leonora Ainsworth (also known as Leonora Dowlan) was an American "scenarist" or screenwriter for studio films produced at various locations in California during the silent era.

She collaborated extensively with her husband William C. Dowlan, an actor who also directed motion pictures for Universal Film Manufacturing Company in Los Angeles and for the American Film Company at its facilities in Santa Barbara. Ainsworth is credited as a screenwriter with researching and developing storylines, composing scripts, and writing and editing the intertitles for many of the films that Dowlan directed, especially those released by Universal between 1915 and mid-1916.

== Early life ==
Cornelia Leonora Ainsworth was born in Michigan in 1871, the younger of two children of Harriet (née Fairchild) and Calvin Ainsworth, a grain buyer in Castleton Township. Little is known about Leonora's early life, although census records in 1880 show that her father was sufficiently prosperous to provide his family a live-in house servant. It is likely that the same prosperity provided Leonora with a thorough education, which is evidenced by her capabilities and later successes as a screenwriter.

== Screenwriting ==
After marrying in 1906, Leonora Ainsworth and her husband William Dowlan by 1912 had relocated from Minnesota to California, where William, a highly experienced stage actor, accepted an offer by the new Universal Film Manufacturing Company to perform in their productions. William's success as a film actor led to additional work for him as a director for Universal and to opportunities for Leonora to demonstrate her talents for screenwriting. By 1915 she was developing screenplays for projects in which her husband served as both actor and director. That year she was credited by either her maiden name or her married name, Leonora Dowlan, for writing a variety of shorts for Universal, including Across The Footlights, Their Secret, The Devil and Idle Hands, Dear Little Old Time Girl, The Masked Substitute, The Mayor’s Decision, The Great Fear, and Just Plain Folks.

Ainsworth in 1916 wrote the screenplays for Lavinia Comes Home and The Madcap, as well as the drama Drugged Waters, a longer five-reeler and the last film in which her husband performed the dual roles of actor and director. Later in 1916, William Dowlan left Universal after four years with the studio. He then signed a contract with the American Film Company to direct the six-reeler Youth's Endearing Charm starring Mary Miles Minter. Despite their departures from Universal, Dowlan and Ainsworth continued their personal and professional partnership. The trade magazine Motion Picture News noted at that time their ongoing partnership in an "authorized" biography of William Dowlan published in the magazine's October 21, 1916, issue:

As Mr. Dowlan wished to devote his whole attention to producing [directing], he asked [Universal] to be relieved of acting. The lead in "Drugged Waters," a five-reel feature, being his last part....Since then he has directed many notable features. Nearly all of which were from scenarios prepared by Leonora Ainsworth. The last feature directed for Universal was "The Madcap," featuring Flora Parker De Haven.

Motion Picture News also complimented the consistent quality of Dowlan's productions in its biography of him, but the trade publication accorded no share of credit to Ainsworth for that quality. Nevertheless, she certainly deserved recognition for some important aspects of Dowlan's films that MPN said distinguished his releases, namely "their accuracy of detail" and their "true-to-life portrayals". Earlier, in March 1916, the film critic for MPN, Peter Milne, did draw specific attention to Ainsworth in his mixed review of Drugged Waters:

"Drugged Waters" has a lot of comedy in it, just enough villainous contrivings to season the comedy, and a very attractive setting in which thirty-three and a third percent. of the action is staged. As for length, five reels is about two too many and there is constant repetition of the same action....Leonora Ainsworth hit upon a very good idea for the basis of her scenario. She unearthed a score of foolish people suffering from fatty degeneration of the pocketbook and placed them in a sanitarium....The waters of this place are drugged by the manager to furnish the required taste.

After mid-1916, Leonora and William's film careers never again experienced the high levels of creativity and productivity that they had achieved at Universal. Leonora's work as a screenwriter had effectively ended by 1917, although William's employment as a director continued for a few more years, working on productions for the American Film Company, Triangle Film Corporation, Metro Pictures, and other studios.

Given the abundance of screenplays that Ainsworth provided Universal in 1915 and during the first half of 1916, it is surprising that she did not receive an entry among over 2,000 biographical sketches and career profiles of personnel in a film-industry directory compiled by Motion Picture News and published by that trade magazine on two occasions in 1916, in an issue in January and then again in October. One section in that directory is devoted specifically to "Scenario Editors and Writers". Although male employees and contracted writers comprise the great majority of entries in that section, 30 of Ainsworth's female colleagues are profiled in the reference as screenwriters for various studios. Her colleagues cited in the directory include Hettie Grey Baker, Emma Bell, Nell B. Bronson, Elsie M. Callaghan, Francis Worcester Doughty, Marion Fairfax, Mary Edith Grant, Grace T. Hadley, Theodosia Harris, Helen Christene Hoerle, Agnes Christine Johnston, Kate Jordan, Maibelle Heikes Justice, Maud Grange Lewis, Jeanie MacPherson, Annie W. Marchant, June Mathis, Frances Marion, Ann Maxwell, Bess Meredyth, Mary H. O'Connor, Ida Park, Olga Printzlau, Doris Schroeder, Flora B. Snyder, Helen Starr, Elaine Sterne, Alice Von Saxmar, Ethel Weber, and Maria A. Wing. Why an entry for a prolific writer like Ainsworth is omitted from the ranks of these other female scenarists is unknown.

== Post-film work ==
By the early 1920s, both Ainsworth and Dowlan had permanently retired from the film industry. They did, though, continue to live in Los Angeles and began working together in an entirely new business, that of merchandising women's apparel. By 1930 the couple and Leonora's 35-year-old daughter Harriet from her previous marriage (long ago adopted by William) were living in a rented residence at 326 North Palm Drive in "Beverly Hills City". All three members of the family were working then as co-owners or "sales managers" of a shop specializing in "Dresses, underwear and hosiery".

== Personal life and death ==
Ainsworth was married twice, the first time to Walter Irving Towne, a native of Massachusetts who worked as a bookkeeper. She and Towne wed in Grand Rapids, Michigan, on May 25, 1892; and two years later they had a daughter, Harriet, named in honor of Leonora's mother. In 1900, the couple was still together in Grand Rapids; however, they were divorced by 1906, the year she married William Christopher Dowlan, who was 11 years her junior. According to the federal census of 1910, Leonora and he were living with William's parents in their boardinghouse in St. Paul, Minnesota. William in that census is also documented being actively employed working in "theatre". By that time they had been married four years and would remain together for another 29 years, until her death. Ainsworth died at age 68 in Los Angeles County in September 1939.
