= Edgar Ainsworth (artist) =

English painter (1905-1975)

- Born: 1905
- Died: 1975 (aged 69–70); Cheltenham, Gloucestershire
- Known for: Painting, magazine illustrator

Edgar Ainsworth (1905-1975) was a British artist, poster designer and magazine illustrator, who is known for the drawings he made at the Bergen-Belsen concentration camp in the months following the camps' liberation by the British Army in 1945.

== Biography ==
Ainsworth studied at the Royal College of Art in the late 1920s and exhibited at the Royal Academy and the New English Art Club. In 1929 Ainsworth painted friezes at the Imperial Institute building in London. Ainsworth designed posters for the General Post Office, Shell and the Empire Marketing Board but was increasing drawn to journalism. He produced illustrated articles for the magazines Leader and Liliput before joining Picture Post. In due course, Ainswoth was appointed to the post of Art Editor for Picture Post.

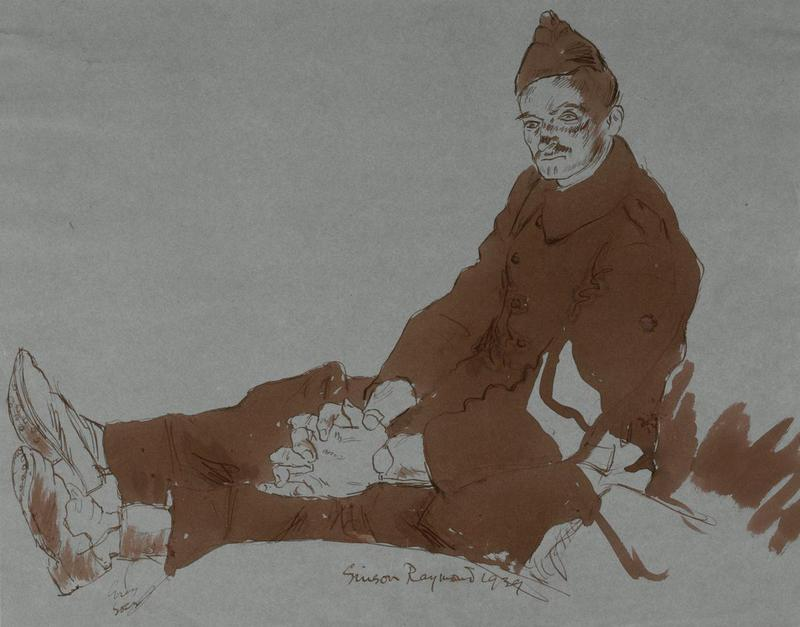
A French Prisoner-of-War (Art.IWM ART LD 5073)

During World War Two, Ainsworth continued to work for Picture Post and also served as a war correspondent and accompanied the American 7th Army on their advance across Europe in 1945. Ainsworth visited the Bergen-Belsen concentration camp three times after the British army entered the complex in April 1945. He made numerous sketches and drawings, often in great detail, while at the camp. In September 1945, Picture Post published several of these drawings along with an article, Victim and Prisoner, by Ainsworth. In the article, Ainsworth attempted to challenge what he saw as the elements of indifference he had encountered in Britain to the Belsen trial, which had started that month. Several of the drawings made by Ainsworth in Belsen were purchased by the War Artists' Advisory Committee and are now held by the Imperial War Museum. Ainsworth also commissioned the author and artist Mervyn Peake to visit Belsen for Picture Post.

After the War, Ainsworth spent time in the Middle East and, during 1948, reported on the civil war in the then Mandatory Palestine for Picture Post. Several of these pictures were also included in the 1949 exhibition Six Artists Abroad, promoted by the Association of Industrial Artists. In 1957 he provided the illustrations for John Pudney's book The Book of Leisure. During the remainder of his life, Ainsworth continued to exhibit at the New English Art Club and also at the Manchester City Art Gallery and the Monks Hall Museum in Salford.

Ainsworth's death was registered at Cheltenham in Gloucestershire.
