= John Edgar Ainsworth =

American physicist and polymath

- Born: June 28, 1920; New Haven, Connecticut, U.S.
- Died: September 30, 2004 (aged 84); Silver Spring, Maryland, U.S.
- Education: St. John's College; Harvard University; University of Maryland
- Occupation: Physicist
- Organization: NASA
- Spouse: Anne Elizabeth Kidder (m. 1952)
- Children: Martha (b. 1955); Julie (b. 1956); Paul (b. 1959)
- Parents: Rev John Edgar Ainsworth (father); Clara Eva Donsife (mother)
- Awards: NASA Exceptional Service Medal; Goddard Special Achievement Award

John Edgar Ainsworth (June 28, 1920 – September 30, 2004) was an American physicist and polymath who worked for NASA. Ainsworth was the primary designer of the Pioneer Venus probe.

== Personal life ==
Ainsworth, the son of Rev. John Edgar Ainsworth and Clara Eva Donsife, married Anne Elizabeth Kidder (1924–2015) on August 27, 1952, in Berkeley, California. Together, Anne and John had three children, Martha, Julie, and Paul.

John Ainsworth died on September 30, 2004, aged 84, in Silver Spring, Maryland.
