= Operation Dragoon order of battle =

World War II order of battle

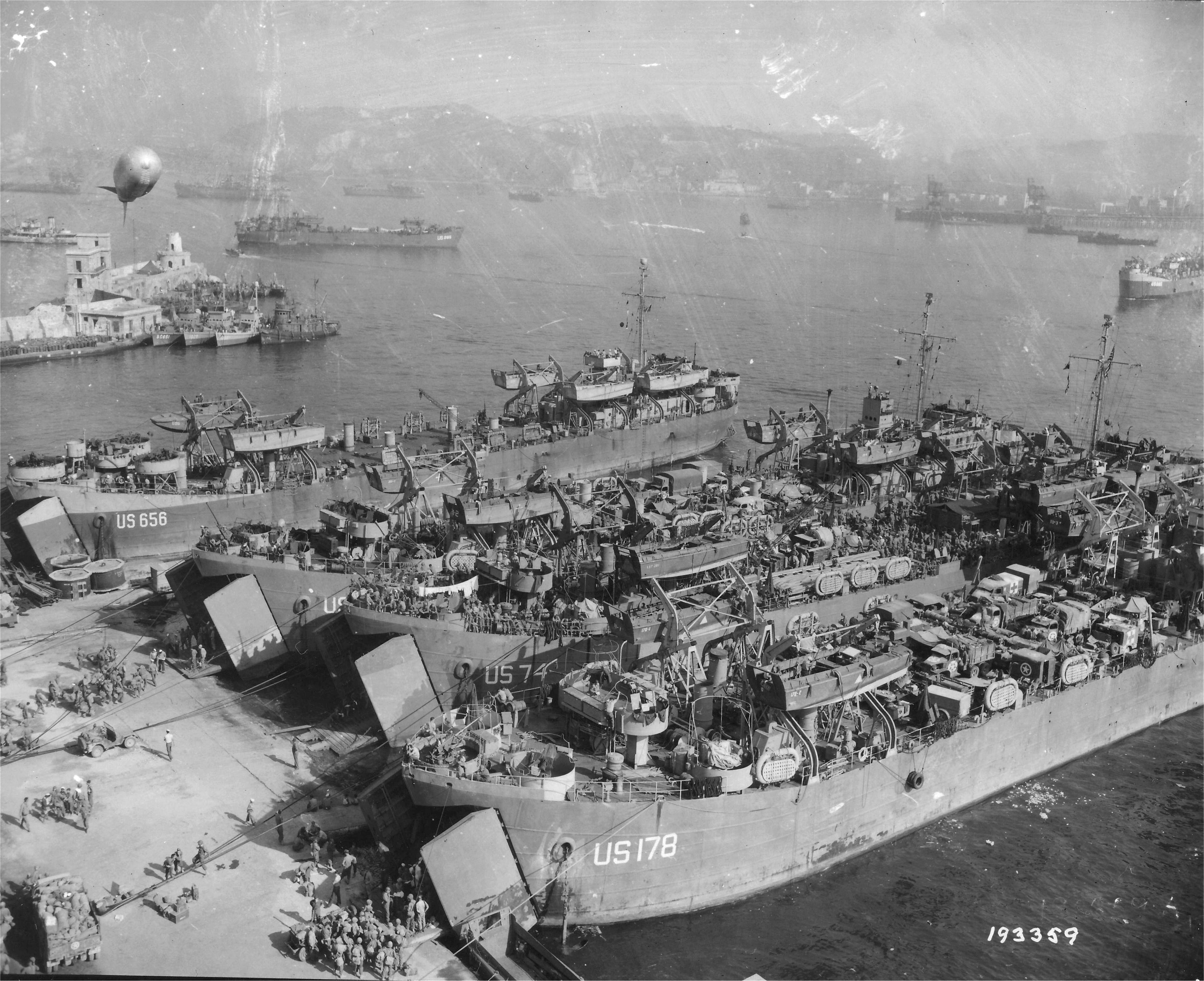
Allied LSTs loading in Naples in preparation for Operation Dragoon

On 15 August 1944, Allied forces carried out Operation Dragoon, a set of simultaneous amphibious landings by three US infantry divisions followed by four Free French divisions along the Mediterranean coast of France. The main landings were preceded by nighttime paratroop drops and commando beach landings. This was a phase of the European Theatre of World War II.

Originally called Operation Anvil, these landings had been intended to take place at the same time as the Normandy landings of Operation Overlord, commonly called D-Day, but were postponed because the necessary shipping was committed to the Normandy operation.

British Prime Minister Winston Churchill strenuously objected to the invasion of Southern France, strongly preferring an operation in the Adriatic Sea. The American high command, however, particularly SHAEF commander General Dwight D. Eisenhower, insisted on opening a port on the Southern French coast even after the lodgment in Normandy was obtained. The ports of Normandy were overwhelmed handling the cargo to support the Overlord invasion forces and another high-capacity port closer to the German frontier was vital if more men and supplies were to be delivered to the continent. Additionally, the high command of the French Liberation Army pushed for a landing on the coast of Provence that would include the large numbers of Free French troops that were being trained. Churchill finally relented only five days before the date set for the landings.

In the Alpha and Delta areas, Allied air assault and naval bombardment had either destroyed the German gun emplacements or driven their crews to abandon them. Only in the Camel zone did the landing forces experience any serious resistance.

The Americans considered Operation Dragoon a success. It enabled them to liberate most of Southern France in just four weeks while inflicting heavy casualties on the German forces (although a substantial part of the best German units were able to escape), and the ports of Marseille and Toulon were soon in operation.

== Allied command structure ==
=== Ground forces ===
==== US Seventh Army ====
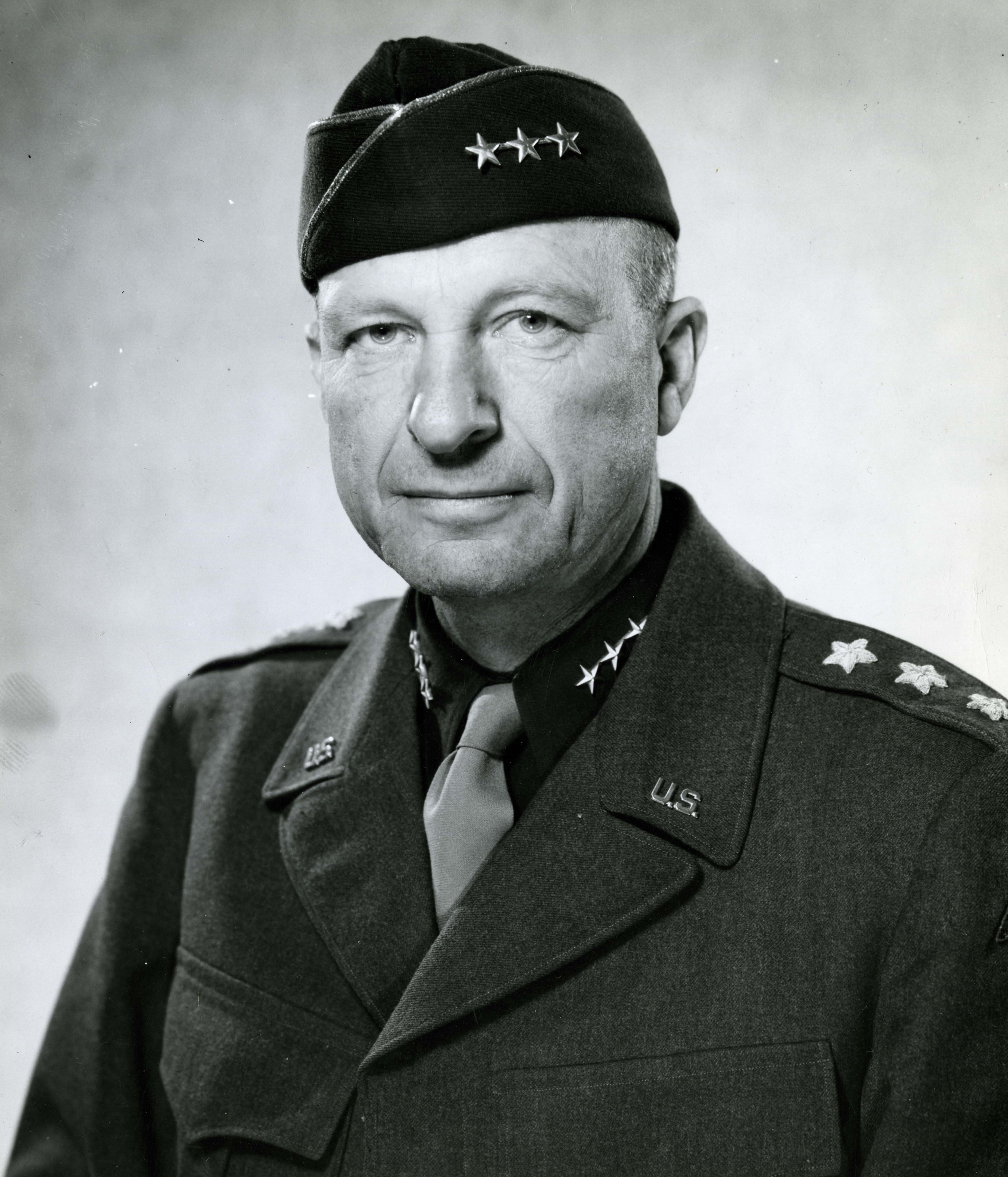
Lt. Gen. Alexander McC. Patch

Lieutenant General Alexander McC. Patch (Note: Had led Americal Division and XIV Army Corps during closing weeks of Guadalcanal Campaign; died of pneumonia approx. 5-1/2 months after the end of the war in Europe.)

Detachment, Army HQ & HQ Company & Special Troops
Detachment, HQ Seventh Army (For Beach Control HQ)

Engineer

Company D (rem Map Plat), 378th Engineer Battalion (Separate)
697th Engineer Petroleum Distribution Company
Mobile Laboratory, 701st Engineer Petroleum Distribution Company
Survey Platoon, 649th Engineer Topographic Battalion
Company A, Engineer Camouflage Battalion
1202nd Engineer Fire Fighting Platoon
1204th Engineer Fire Fighting Platoon
1711th Engineer Map Depot Detachment
Special Platoon, 460th Engineer Depot Company

Military Police

204th Military Police Company
372d Military Police Escort Guard Company
377th Military Police Escort Guard Company (-3 Sections)
504th Military Police Battalion (-2 Companies)
HQ & HQ Detachment, 759th Military Police Battalion

Medical

1st Advance Section, 7th Medical Depot Company

Quartermaster

94th Quartermaster Railhead Company (-2 Platoons)
138th Quartermaster Truck Company
144th Quartermaster Truck Company
Detachment, 202nd Quartermaster Car Company (-)
HQ & HQ Detachment, 528th Quartermaster Battalion
3357th Quartermaster Truck Company

Signal

Army Signal Battalion
226th Signal Operation Company
Detachment, 163rd Signal Photo Company
982nd Signal Service Company

Miscellaneous

Detachment 72nd Liaison Squadron
11th Postal Regulating Unit
Special Service Staff (Office of Strategic Services)
Twenty-eight Port Companies and Seven Battalion HQ Detachments.

US VI Corps

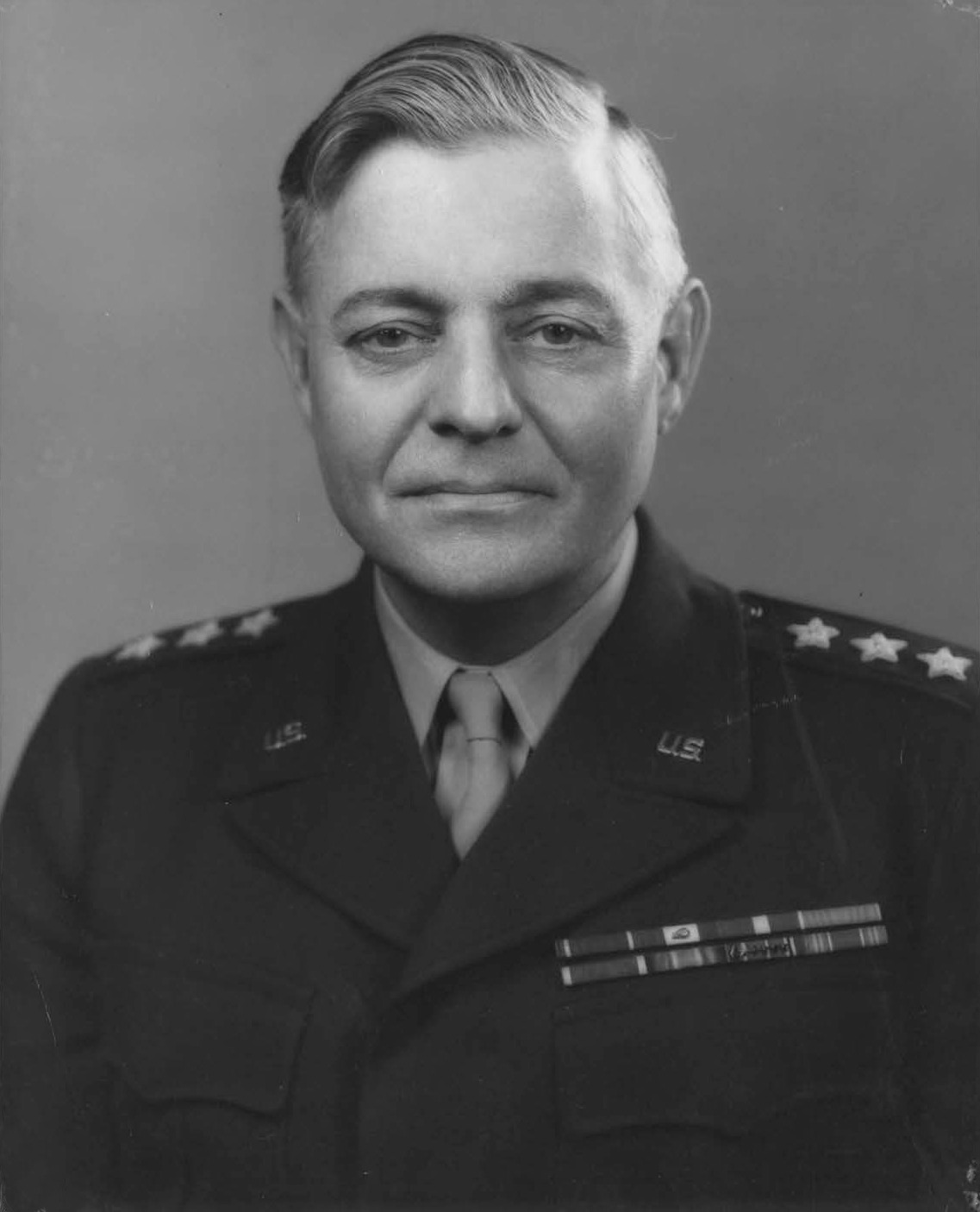
Lucian K. Truscott, Jr. as a lieutenant general

Major General Lucian K. Truscott, Jr.
VI Corps consisted of the US 3rd, 45th and 36th Infantry Divisions; these units are detailed in the Alpha Force, Delta Force and Camel Force sections, respectively, below.

HQ & HQ Company, VI Corps
Combat Command

Combat Command Sudre 1ere Division Blindee
Attached

1ere Cie, 9e Regt Chasseurs d'Afrique
Det, 661/2 Cie De Reparation Engines Blindee
66e Cie de Munitions (-)
Det, 705 Cie de Ravitaillement en Essence

Field Artillery

HQ & HQ Battery, VI Corps Artillery
HQ & HQ Battery, 6th Field Artillery Group
HQ & HQ Battery, 35th Field Artillery Group
HQ & HQ Battery, 36th Field Artillery Group
2nd Field Artillery Observation Battalion
36th Field Artillery Battalion (155mm Gun)
59th Field Artillery Battalion (105mm Howitzer SP)
69th Field Artillery Battalion (105mm Howitzer SP)
93rd Field Artillery Battalion (105mm Howitzer SP)
141st Field Artillery Battalion (155mm Howitzer)
634th Field Artillery Battalion (155mm Howitzer)
937th Field Artillery Battalion (155mm Howitzer)
938th Field Artillery Battalion (155mm Howitzer)
976th Field Artillery Battalion (155mm Gun)
977th Field Artillery Battalion (155mm Gun)

Antiaircraft Artillery

HQ & HQ Battery, 35th Antiaircraft Artillery Brigade
HQ & HQ Battery, 5th Antiaircraft Artillery Group
HQ & HQ Battery, 68th Antiaircraft Artillery Group
HQ & HQ Battery, 105th Antiaircraft Artillery Group
68th Antiaircraft Artillery Gun Battalion (Mobile)
72nd Antiaircraft Artillery Gun Battalion (Mobile)
106th Antiaircraft Artillery (Automatic Weapons) Battalion (SP)
107th Antiaircraft Artillery (Automatic Weapons) Battalion (Mobile)
108th Antiaircraft Artillery Gun Battalion (Mobile)
216th Antiaircraft Artillery Gun Battalion (Mobile)
433rd Antiaircraft Artillery (Automatic Weapons) Battalion (Mobile)
441st Antiaircraft Artillery (Automatic Weapons) Battalion (SP)
443rd Antiaircraft Artillery (Automatic Weapons) Battalion (SP)
451st Antiaircraft Artillery (Automatic Weapons) Battalion (Mobile)
534th Antiaircraft Artillery (Automatic Weapons) Battalion (Mobile)
895th Antiaircraft Artillery (Automatic Weapons) Battalion (Mobile)
102nd Antiaircraft Artillery Barrage Balloon Battery (VLA)
103rd Antiaircraft Artillery Barrage Balloon Battery (VLA)
104th Antiaircraft Artillery Barrage Balloon Battery (VLA)

Armor

191st Tank Battalion
753rd Tank Battalion
756th Tank Battalion

Tank Destroyer

601st Tank Destroyer Battalion
636th Tank Destroyer Battalion
645th Tank Destroyer Battalion

Cavalry

117th Cavalry Reconnaissance Squadron

Chemical Warfare

2nd Chemical Battalion Motorized (-1 Company)
3rd Chemical Battalion Motorized
83rd Chemical Battalion Motorized (-1 Company)
6th Chemical Depot Company
11th Chemical Maintenance Company
21st Chemical Decontamination Company (-3 platoons) (Smoke Troops)

Engineer

343rd Engineer General Service Regiment
344th Engineer General Service Regiment
Company C, (Bailey bridge), 378th Engineer Battalion (Separate)
Company D, (Treadway Bridge), 378th Engineer Battalion (Separate)
1st Platoon, 424th Engineer Dump Truck Company
Contact Platoon, 469th Engineer Maintenance Company
Survey Platoon, 661st Engineer Topographic Company
6617th Engineer Mine Clearance Company

Military Police

206th Military Police Company

Medical

2nd Auxiliary Surgical Group

14 General Surgical Teams
3 Shock Teams
1 Gas Team
3 Orthopaedic Teams
2 Thoracic Teams
2 Neurosurgery Teams
3 Dental Prosthetic Teams
2 Maxillofacial Teams

10th Field Hospital
6703rd Blood Transfusion Unit
11th Field Hospital
11th Evacuation Hospital (Semimobile) (400 bed)
93rd Evacuation Hospital (Semimobile) (400 bed)
95th Evacuation Hospital (Semimobile) (400 bed)

Ordnance

HQ & HQ Detachment, 43rd Ordnance Battalion
HQ & HQ Detachment, 44th Ordnance Battalion
HQ & HQ Detachment, 45th Ordnance Battalion
14th Ordnance Medium Maintenance Company
45th Ordnance Medium Maintenance Company
46th Ordnance Medium Maintenance Company
87th Ordnance Heavy Maintenance Company (Field Artillery)
261st Ordnance Medium Maintenance Company (Anti Aircraft)
3406th Ordnance Medium Automotive Maintenance Company
3408th Ordnance Medium Automotive Maintenance Company
3432nd Ordnance Medium Automotive Maintenance Company
64th Ordnance Ammunition Company
66th Ordnance Ammunition Company
680th Ordnance Ammunition Company
143rd Ordnance Bomb Disposal Squad
144th Ordnance Bomb Disposal Squad
145th Ordnance Bomb Disposal Squad
146th Ordnance Bomb Disposal Squad

Quartermaster

46th Quartermaster Graves Registration Company (-1 Platoon)
Platoon, 549th Quartermaster Laundry Company
3426th Quartermaster Truck Company

Signal

1st Signal Center Team
57th Signal Battalion
3201 SIS Detachment
4 Detachments, 163rd Signal Photo Company
Detachment A, 117th Radio Intelligence Company

Naval

3 Naval Combat Intelligence Teams
Naval Gunfire Liaison Personnel
15 Naval Shore Fire Control Parties

==== Armee "B" ====
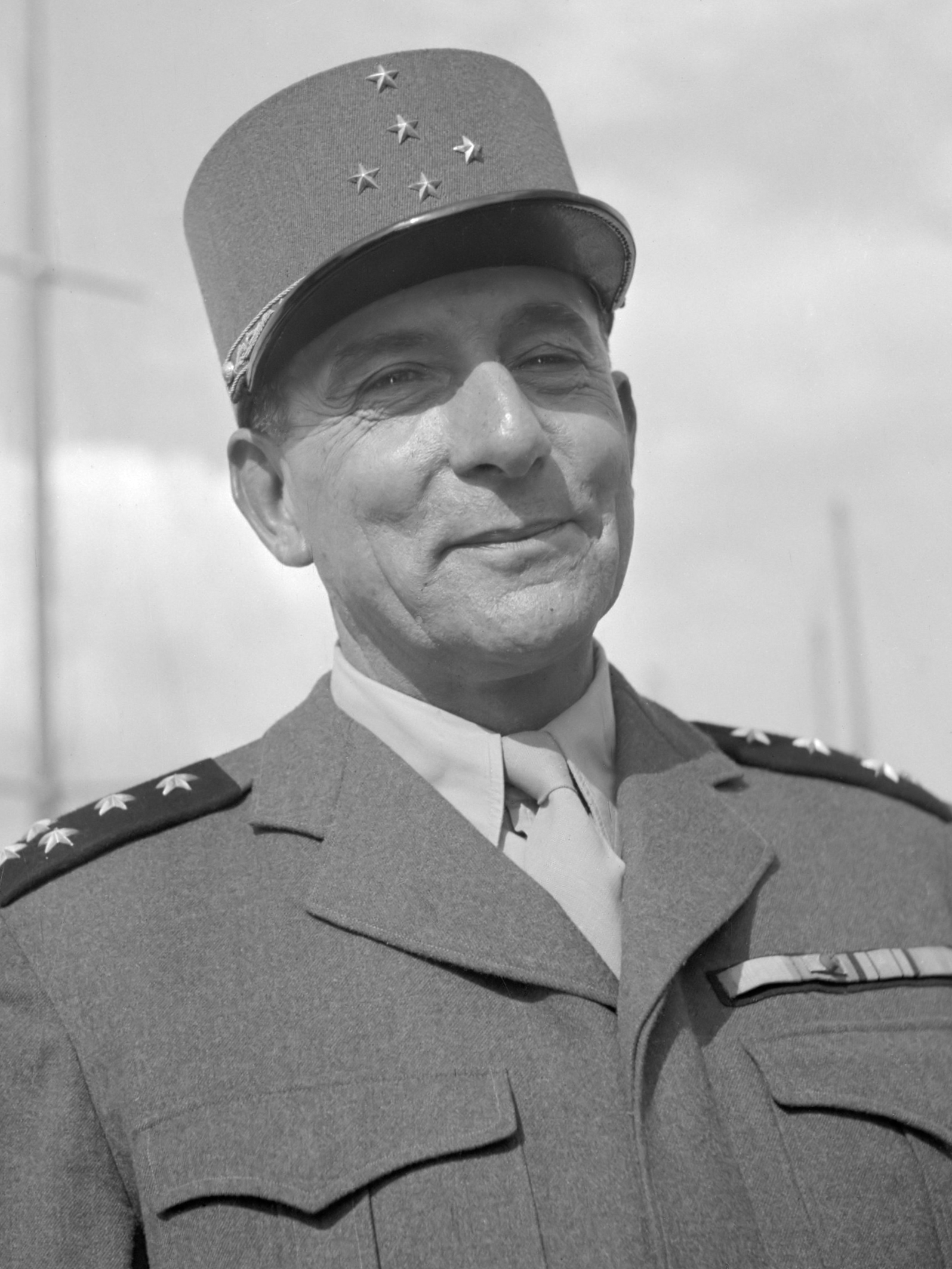
Jean de Lattre de Tassigny

Armee B constituted the follow-up landing force

Général d'armée Jean de Lattre de Tassigny (Note: Later successfully led French forces against the Việt Minh in the First Indochina War.)

Etat-major de l'Armée "B", compagnie de quartier général 162/27 (-)

2ème Corps d'Armee
Général de corps d'armée Edgard de Larminat

Etat-major du 2ème Corps d'Armée et compagnie de quartier général 75

Divisions

1ère Division de Marche d'Infanterie - gen. Diego Brosset
1ère Division Blindée (-2 CC) - gen. Jean Touzet du Vigier
3ème Division d'Infanterie Algérienne - gen. Joseph de Goislard de Monsabert
9ème Division d'Infanterie Coloniale - gen. Joseph Magnan
2ème Régiment de Spahis Algériens (Reconnaissance Battalion)
1er Groupe de Tabors Marocains
3ème Groupe de Tabors Marocains
4ème Groupe de Tabors Marocains

Field Artillery

Etat-major du Groupement d'artillerie
No. 1 Detachment, 1st Field Artillery Observation Battalion (US)
1er groupe du Régiment d'Artillerie Coloniale du Levant
3ème groupe du 65e Régiment d'Artillerie

Antiaircraft Artillery

Detachment, HQ & HQ Battery, 34th AAA Brigade (US)
62nd AAA Gun Battalion (US)
Detachment, HQ & HQ Battery, 80th AAA Group (US)
893rd AAA (AW) Battalion (SM)

Tank Destroyer

Chasseurs d'Afrique

7ème Régiment de Chasseurs d'Afrique
8ème Régiment de Chasseurs d'Afrique

Engineer

Compagnie Topographique du Génie No. 31
101ème Régiment du Génie

Military Police

521ème Regulatrice Routiere
2e compagnie du 11e groupe de la Garde

Medical

401ème Hôpital d'Evacuation Organe de Réanimation et de Transfusion No. 441/3
405ème Hôpital d'Evacuation
432ème Bataillion Médical
451/1 Depot Avancé
422e Hôpital de Campagne

Ordnance

Etat-major du 651ème Bataillon de Réparation

Compagnie Moyenne de Réparation du Materiel No. 652/1
Compagnie Moyenne de Réparation Automobile No. 651/3
Compagnie Moyenne de Réparation Automobile No. 652/3

64e Compagnie de Munitions
65e Compagnie de Munitions

Quartermaster

1er bataillon du 8ème Régiment de Tirailleurs Sénégalais, Pioniers
Gestion de Subsistance d'Etapes No. 323
Gestion de Subsistance d'Etapes No. 325
Compagnie Mixte de Ravitaillement en Essence No. 704 (2 detachments)

Signal

61ème Bataillon de Transmissions de Corps d'Armée
6693rd Signal Detachment (Provisional) (US)
3 Detachments, 163rd Signal Photo Company (US)
806ème Bataillon de Construction
Detachment, Trans Armée "B"

Compagnie d' Exploitation 827/1
Station d'Ecoutes 828
Groupe de télégraphie militaire 829

Détachement du Parc de Transmissions No. 810 & Détachement de la Compagnie Technique de Transmissions No. 841

Transportation

11ème compagnie du Groupe de Transport No. 501

=== Naval forces ===
==== US Eighth Fleet ====
Vice Adm. H. Kent Hewitt, USN

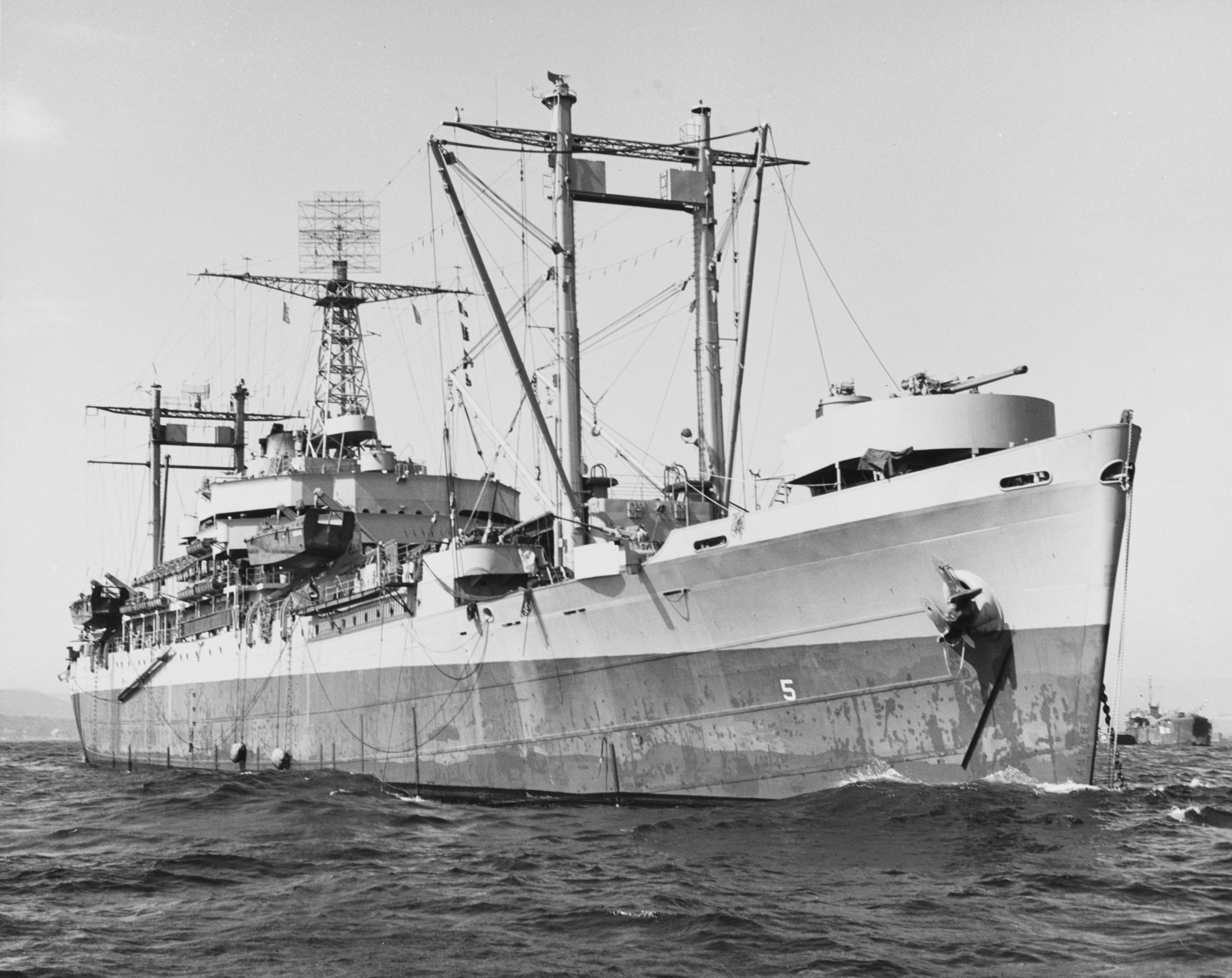
Vice Admiral Hewitt's flagship Catoctin off Southern France

Vice Admiral H. Kent Hewitt in amphibious force command ship Catoctin'

Control Group
Vice Admiral Hewitt

1 amphibious force flagship: Catoctin
1 Gleaves-class destroyer (4 × 5-in. main battery): Plunkett
9 minesweepers

8 Auk-class minesweepers: Auk, Broadbill, Chickadee, Nuthatch, Pheasant, Staff, Swift, Threat
1 Raven-class minesweeper: Raven

Special Operations Group (Note: Neither diversionary operation succeeded in fooling the Germans about the location of the main assault.)
Captain H.C. Johnson

Western Diversionary Unit (Captain Johnson)
Landings west of Alpha beaches

1 Gleaves-class destroyer (4 × 5-in. main battery): Endicott
4 minelayers
8 PT boats
12 ASRC

Eastern Diversionary Unit (Lieutenant Commander Douglas Fairbanks, Jr., (Note: Noted Hollywood actor before and after war) USNR)
Landings east of Camel beaches

4 gunboats HMS Aphis, HMS Scarab, HMS Stuart Prince, HMS Antwerp
3 minelayers
4 PT boats

==== Aircraft Carrier Force (Task Force 88) ====
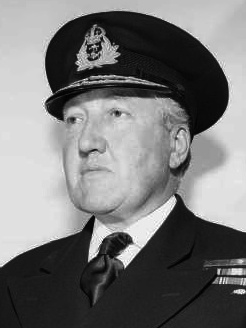
Thomas H. Troubridge, RN

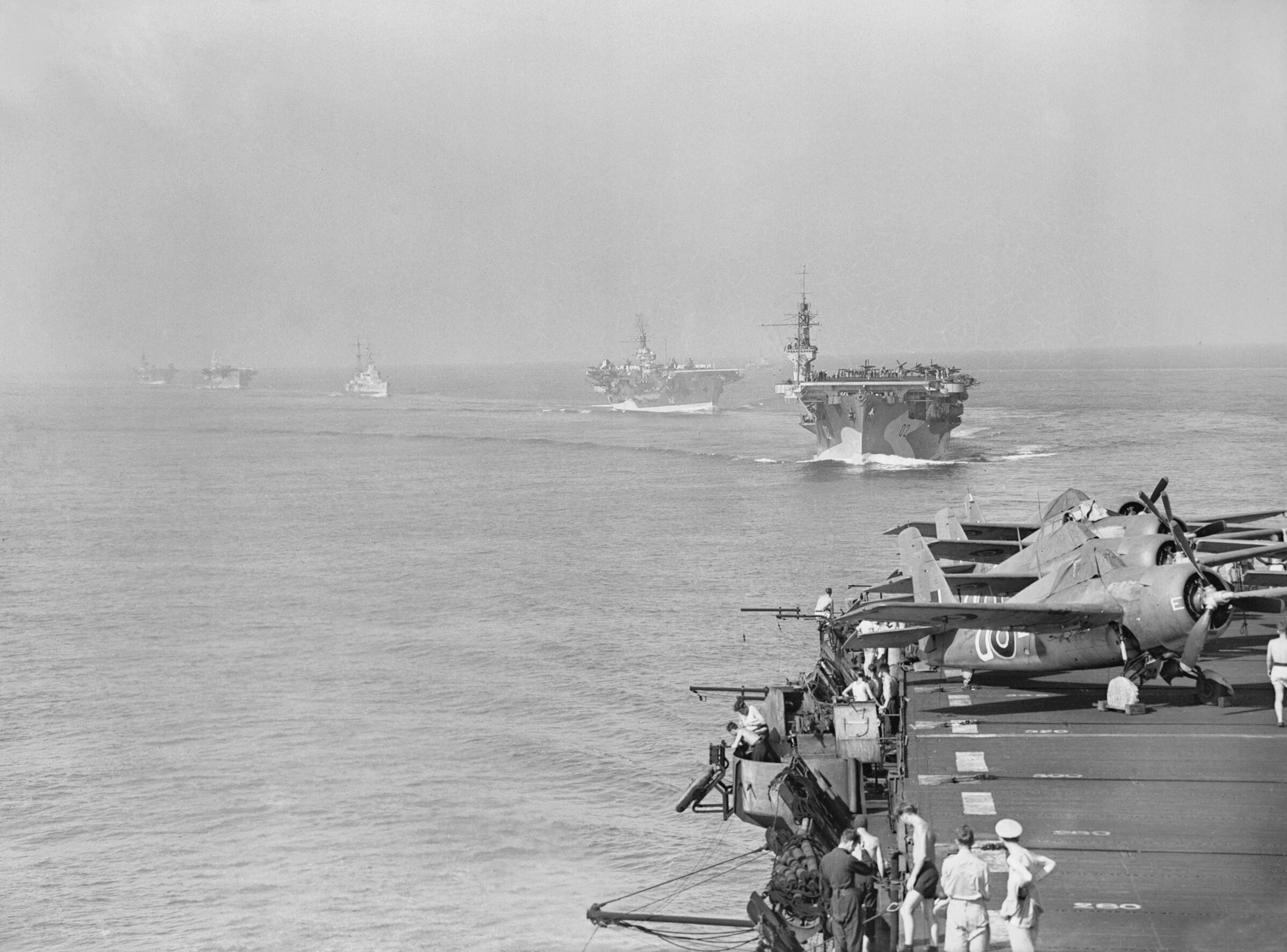
HMS Attacker and Khedive, just prior to Operation Dragoon, 7 August 1944

Rear Admiral Thomas Hope Troubridge, RN in light cruiser HMS Royalist

Task Group 88.1
Rear Admiral Troubridge

5 escort carriers

HMS Khedive: 899 Naval Air Squadron (Supermarine Seafire fighters)
HMS Emperor: 800 Naval Air Squadron (Grumman F6F Hellcat fighters)
HMS Searcher: 882 Naval Air Squadron (Grumman F4F Wildcat fighters)
HMS Pursuer: 881 Naval Air Squadron (Grumman F4F Wildcat fighters)
HMS Attacker: 879 Naval Air Squadron (Supermarine Seafire fighters)

2 anti-aircraft light cruisers: HMS Royalist, HMS Delhi
7 destroyers

5 T-class: HMS Troubridge, HMS Tuscan, HMS Tyrian, HMS Teazer, HMS Tumult
1 E-class: HHMS Navarinon
1 Type II Hunt-class: HMS Wheatland

Task Group 88.2
Rear Admiral Calvin T. Durgin, USN

4 escort carriers

Tulagi: VOF-01 (Grumman F6F Hellcat fighters)
Kasaan Bay: VF-74 (Grumman F6F Hellcat fighters)
HMS Hunter: 807 Naval Air Squadron (Supermarine Seafire fighters)
HMS Stalker: 809 Naval Air Squadron (Supermarine Seafire fighters)

2 antiaircraft light cruisers: HMS Colombo, HMS Caledon
6 destroyers

5 Gleaves-class (4 × 5-in. main battery): Jeffers, Butler, Gherardi, Herndon, Shubrick
1 Benson-class (5 × 5-in. main battery): Murphy

6 British minelayers

==== Antisubmarine and Convoy Control Group (Task Group 80.6) ====
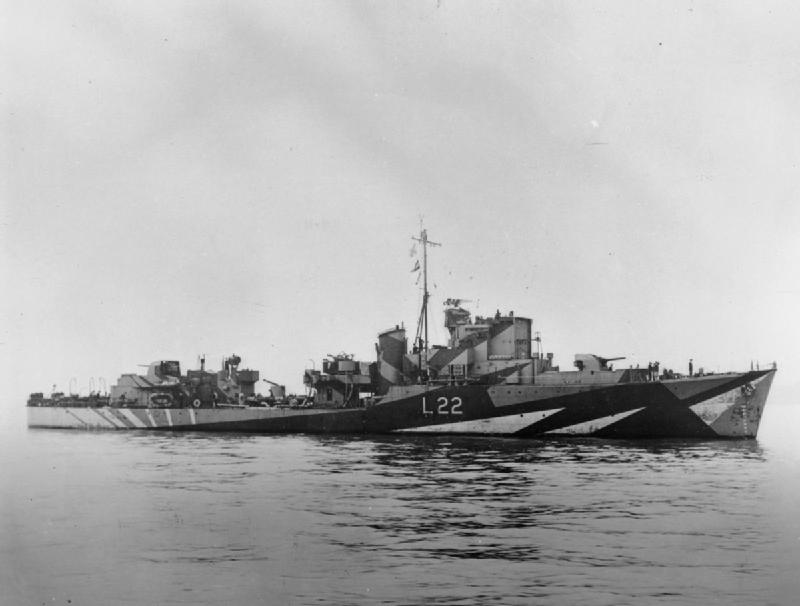
Hunt-class destroyer Aldenham at anchor

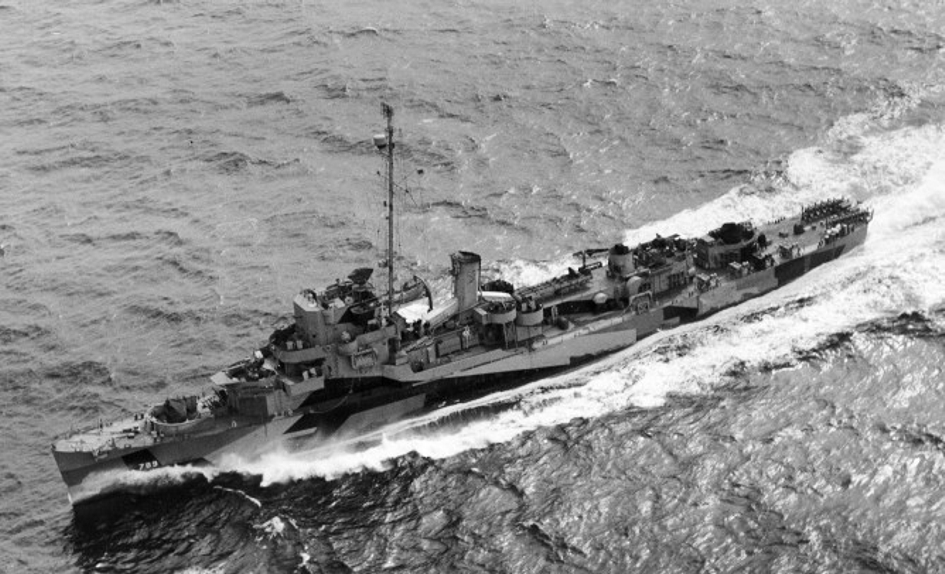
Destroyer escort Tatum underway

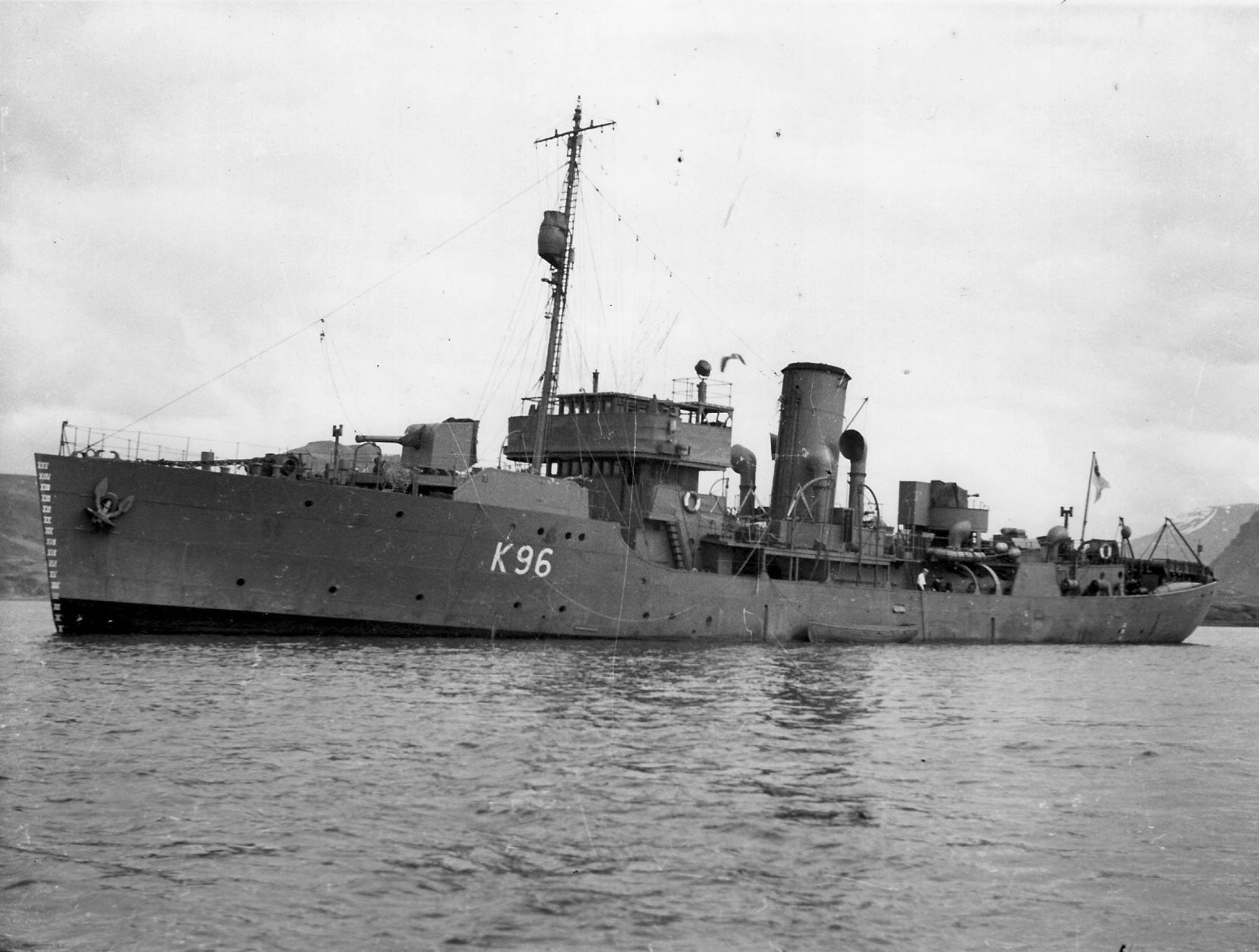
Corvette Aubrietia at anchor

Captain J.P. Clay

40 destroyers

21 Hunt-class

HMS Atherstone, HMS Cleveland, HMS Whaddon HMS Beaufort, HMS Bicester, HMS Blackmore, HMS Calpe, HMS Farndale, HMS Lauderdale, HMS Liddesdale, HMS Oakley, HMS Zetland', HHMS Kriti HMS Aldenham, HMS Belvoir, HMS Catterick, HMS Eggesford, HHMS Themistoklis, HMS Haydon, HHMS Pindos HMS Brecon

9 Gleaves-class (4 × 5-in. main battery): Niblack, Carmick, McCook, Frankford, Baldwin, Harding, Satterlee, Thompson, Doyle
4 Benson-class (5 × 5-in. main battery): Benson, Madison, Hilary P. Jones, Charles F. Hughes
1 Somers-class (8 × 5-in. main battery): Jouett
5 French destroyers: Le Fortuné, Forbin, Simoun, Tempête, Alcyon

6 destroyer escorts

4 Buckley-class (3 × 3-in. main battery): Tatum, Haines, Marsh, Currier
2 Edsall-class (3 × 3-in. main battery): Frederick C. Davis, Herbert C. Jones

7 corvettes

5 French: Marocain, Tunisien, Hova, Algérien, Somali
2 British: HMS Aubrietia, HMS Columbine

6 French sloops: Commandant Domine, La Moqueuse, Commandant Bory, La Gracieuse, Commandant Delage, La Boudeuse
12 minesweepers

6 Admirable-class: Improve, Implicit, Incessant, Incredible, Mainstay, Pinnacle
6 yard minesweepers

== Sitka Force ==
Parachute and commando landings night of 14–15 August

=== Sitka parachute and commando forces ===
1st Airborne Task Force

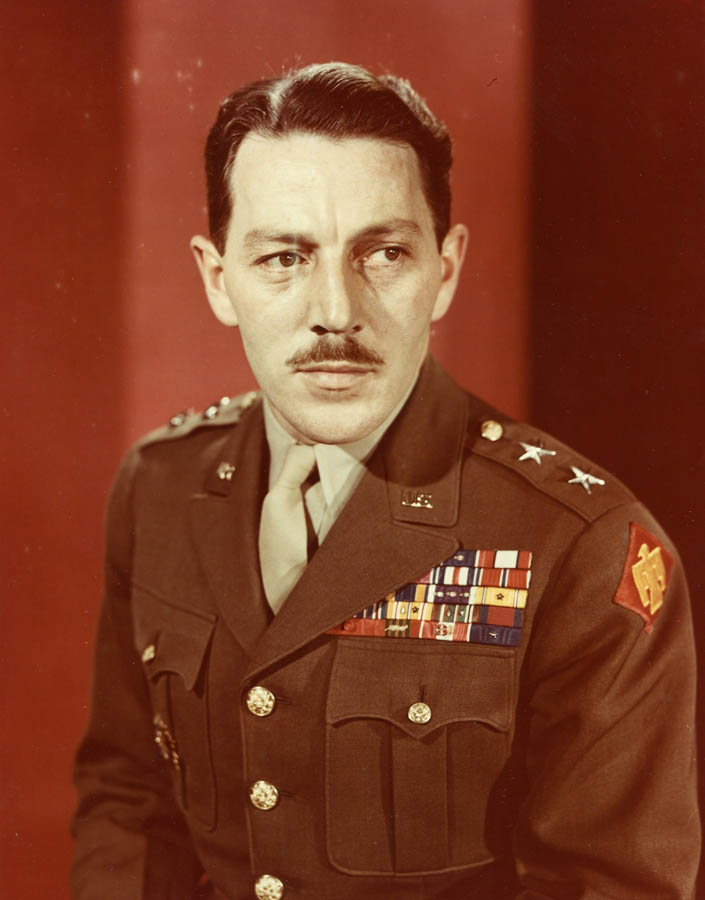
Maj. Gen. Robert T. Frederick

Brigadier General Robert T. Frederick

HQ & HQ Company, 1st Airborne Task Force
517th Parachute Infantry Regiment

1st Battalion
2nd Battalion
3rd Battalion
460th Parachute Field Artillery Battalion (Note: HQ and four batteries of four 75mm pack howitzers)
596th Airborne Engineer Company

509th Parachute Infantry Battalion
550th Airborne Infantry Battalion (Glider)
551st Parachute Infantry Battalion (United States) (Reinforced)
463rd Airborne Field Artillery Battalion
602d Glider Field Artillery Battalion (75mm Pack)
887th Airborne Engineer Aviation Company
512th Airborne Signal Company
Antitank Company, 442d Infantry Regiment:
552nd Antitank Company (Note: Formed in July, 1944, in Rome, specifically for this operation. Since the 442nd became available while the 552nd was in training and took very little time to train on the British 6 lb. guns need for gliders, it went in first. But the 552nd was always on the complement of troops slated for this operation (and the 1st ABTF) and relieved the 442nd mid-October 1944 supporting the 1st ABTF member units still in the area. From documents from the National Archives.)
Company A, 2nd Chemical Mortar Battalion
Company D (airborne), 83d Chemical Mortar Battalion
676th Medical Collecting Company
Provisional Airborne Military Police Platoon
Provisional Pathfinder Detachment
172d Detail Issues Depot British Heavy Aerial Resupply Company
334th Quartermaster Depot Company(-)
3358th Quartermaster Truck Company
Detachment, 3d Ordnance Company (Medium Maintenance)
British 2nd Independent Parachute Brigade Group

4th Parachute Battalion
5th (Scottish) Parachute Battalion
6th (Royal Welch) Parachute Battalion
127th (Parachute) Field Ambulance
300th Airlanding Anti-tank Battery Royal Artillery
64th Airlanding Battery Royal Artillery
2nd Parachute Squadron Royal Engineers
2nd Independent Parachute Brigade Group Signal Company Royal Signals
1st Independent Glider Squadron Army Air Corps
23rd Independent Platoon Army Air Corps (Pathfinders)
2nd Independent Parachute Brigade Group Company Royal Army Service Corps
751st Parachute Brigade Company Royal Army Service Corps
T Company Royal Army Service Corps
2nd Independent Parachute Brigade Group Workshop Royal Electrical and Mechanical Engineers
2nd Independent Parachute Brigade Group Provost Section Royal Military Police

US-Canadian 1st Special Service Force(-) (Note: Attached 22 August 1944 to replace the British 2nd Parachute brigade; later assigned)
French Groupe de Commandos(-)

Commandos d'Afrique (750 men)
Groupe Naval d'Assault de la Marine en Corse (67 men)

=== Sitka naval forces ===
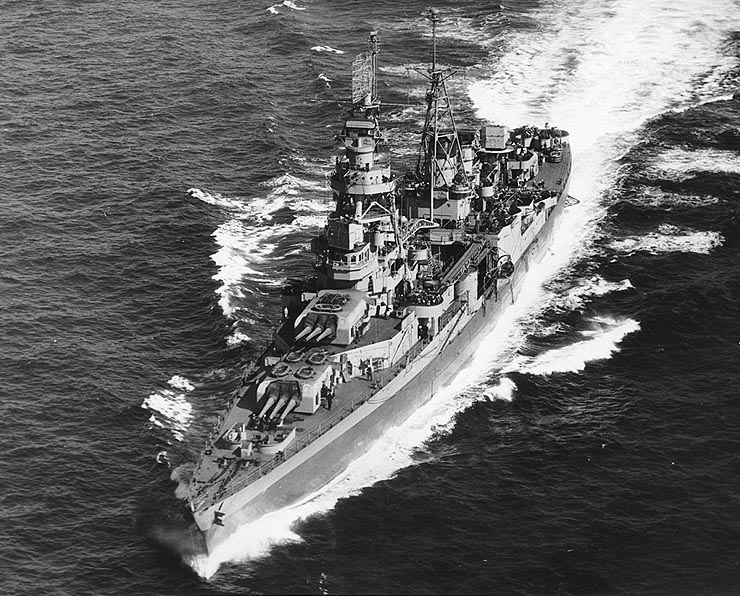
(United States) Rear Adm. Davidson's flagship Augusta underway, May 1945

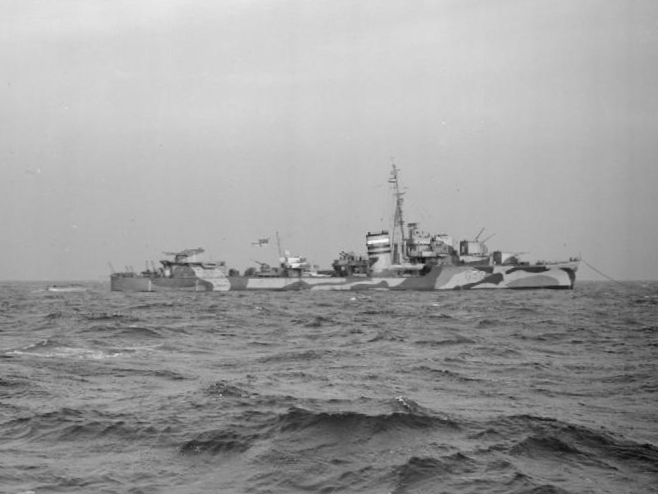
(United Kingdom) Destroyer Lookout

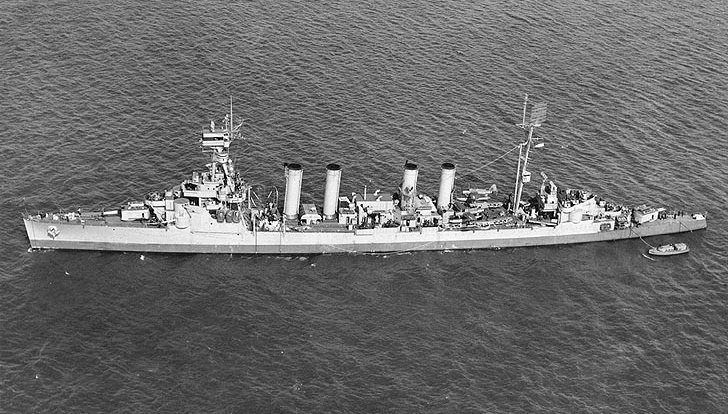
(United States) Light cruiser Cincinnati

Rear Admiral Lyal A. Davidson in heavy cruiser Augusta

Gunfire Support Group
Rear Admiral Davidson

1 Lorraine
1 heavy cruiser: Augusta
1 light cruiser: HMS Dido
4 destroyers

1 Somers-class (6 × 5-in. main battery): Somers
1 Gleaves-class (4 × 5-in. main battery): Gleaves
1 L-class: HMS Lookout
1 Hunt-class: HHMS Themistoklis

3 light cruisers: (Note: In reserve) Omaha, Cincinnati, HMS Sirius

Transport Group
Rear Admiral Theodore E. Chandler (Note: Mortally wounded in kamikaze attack off Manila Bay, January 1945)

Unit A

2 destroyer transports: Tattnall, HMS Prince Baudoin
1 PT boat: PT-201

Unit B

HMCS Prince Henry
4 destroyer transports: Barry, Greene, Roper, Osmond Ingram
4 PT boats

Romeo Unit

HMCS Prince David, HMS Prins Albert, HMS Princess Beatrix
4 PT boats

Screen

8 PT boats

Minesweeper Group

5 British: HMS Larne, HMS Clinton, HMS Octavia, HMS Stormcloud, HMS Welfare
4 minelayers
1 danlayer: HMS Kintyre

== Alpha Force ==
Landings near St. Tropez, 15 August

=== Alpha ground forces ===
3rd Infantry "Rock of the Marne" Division

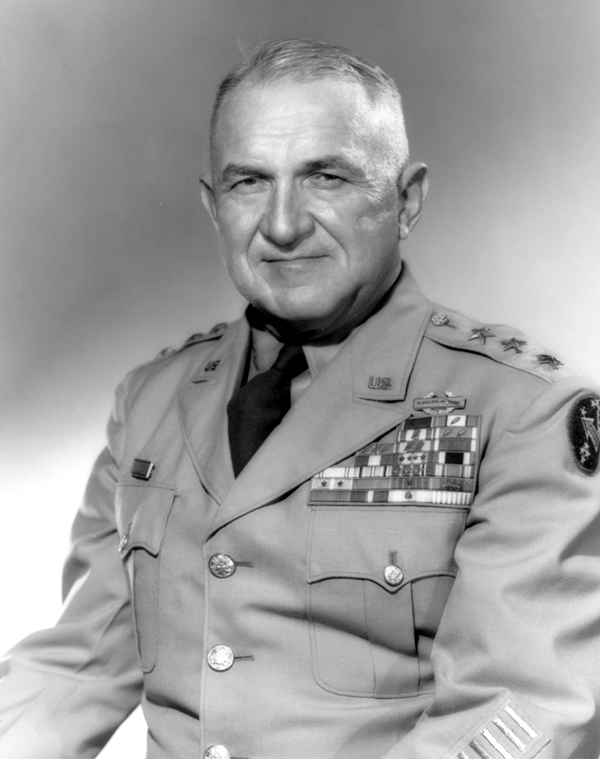
John W. O'Daniel as a lieutenant general

Major General John W. O'Daniel

Organic Units

HHC & Special Troops

3rd Military Police Platoon
3rd Signal Company
3rd Quartermaster Company
3rd Counter Intelligence Corps Detachment
3rd Mechanized Reconnaissance Troop
703rd Ordnance Light Maintenance Company
10th Engineer Combat Battalion
3rd Medical Battalion

Infantry

7th Infantry Regiment
15th Infantry Regiment
30th Infantry Regiment

Artillery

9th Field Artillery Battalion (105mm Howitzer)
10th Field Artillery Battalion (105mm Howitzer)
39th Field Artillery Battalion (105mm Howitzer)
41st Field Artillery Battalion (155mm Howitzer)

3rd Infantry Division Beach Group

36th Engineer Combat Regiment
1st Naval Beach Battalion
72nd Signal Company (Special)
Detachment, 207th Signal Depot Company
Detachment, 177th Signal Repair Company
HQ & HQ Detachment, 52nd Medical Battalion

376th Medical Collecting Company
377th Medical Collecting Company
378th Medical Collecting Company
682nd Medical Collecting Company
1st Plat & HQ Detachment, 616th Medical Clearing Company

Detachment, Boat Guards

157th Military Police Prisoner of War Detachment
706th Military Police Prisoner of War Detachment
790th Military Police Prisoner of War Detachment

Detachment, 377th Military Police Escort Guard Company
Company A, 759th Military Police Battalion
1st Platoon, 21st Chemical Decontamination Company (Smoke Troops)
Detachment, 63rd Chemical Depot Company
3rd Platoon, 450th Engineer Depot Company
69th Ordnance Ammunition Company
Detachment, 77th Ordnance Depot Company
Detachment, 977th Ordnance Depot Company
3407th Ordnance Medium Automotive Maintenance Company (DUKW)
6690th Regulating Company

HQ & HQ Detachment, 530th Quartermaster Battalion

4133rd Quartermaster Service Company
4134th Quartermaster Service Company
4135th Quartermaster Service Company
4136th Quartermaster Service Company
3277th Quartermaster Service Company

3357th Quartermaster Truck Company
3634th Quartermaster Truck Company
HQ & HQ Detachment, 52nd Quartermaster Battalion (Mobile)

3333rd Quartermaster Truck Company (DUKW)
3334th Quartermaster Truck Company (DUKW)
3325th Quartermaster Truck Company (DUKW)
3336th Quartermaster Truck Company (DUKW)
3353rd Quartermaster Truck Company (DUKW)
3355th Quartermaster Truck Company (DUKW)

Section, 3856th Quartermaster Gas Supply Company
1 Platoon, 93rd Quartermaster Railhead Company
332nd Air Force Beach Detail
111th Beach Section, RAF

=== Alpha naval forces ===
Task Force 84

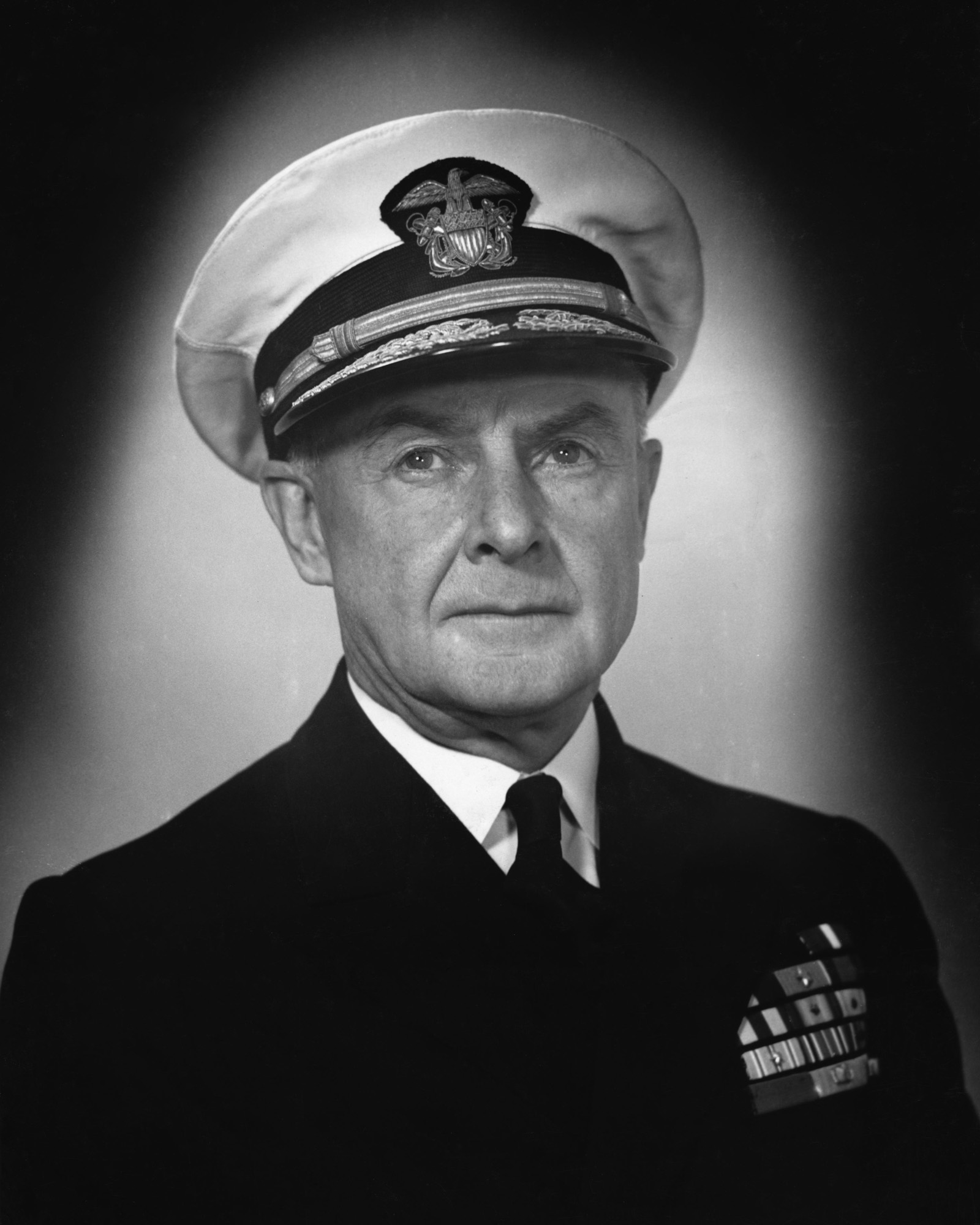
Rear Adm. Frank J. Lowry

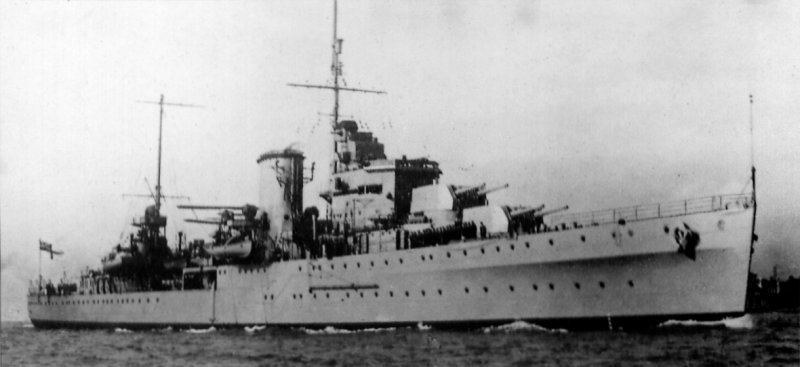
(United Kingdom) Light cruiser Ajax

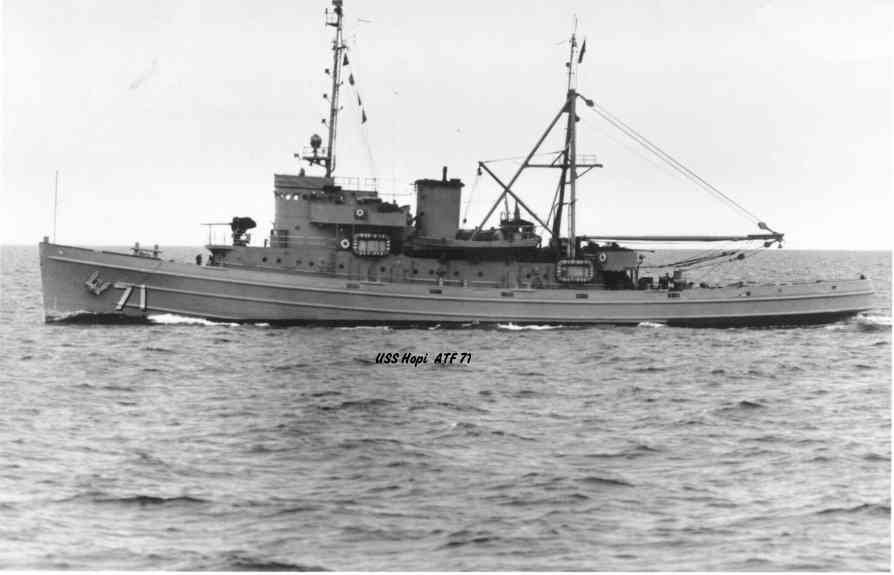
(United States) Fleet tug Hopi

Rear Admiral Frank J. Lowry in Coast Guard cutter Duane

Force Flagship Group

1 Coast Guard cutter: Duane
1 fighter director ship: HMS Ulster Queen
1 LCI-953
1 subchaser: PC-1169

Assault Groups

Red Beach Assault Group

46 LCI, 25 LST, 7 LCC, 43 LCT, 11 LCM, 1 LCG, 1 LCF, 7 LCS, 4 British AM, 5 PC

Yellow Beach Assault Group

2 attack transports: Samuel Chase, Henrico
2 transports: Anne Arundel, Thurston
3 attack freighters: Oberon, Andromeda, HMS Highway
6 SC, 4 PC, 3 LCC, 6 LST, 9 LCI, 1 LCG, 1 LCF, 17 LCT, 9 LCM, 6 LCS, 4 British AM

Gunfire Support Group (Rear Admiral J. M. Mansfield, RN)

1 battleship: HMS Ramillies
1 heavy cruiser: Quincy
5 light cruisers: HMS Orion, HMS Aurora, HMS Ajax, HMS Black Prince, French Gloire
6 destroyers

4 Gleaves-class (4 × 5-in. main battery): Livermore, Eberle, Kearny, Ericsson
2 T-class: HMS Terpsichore, HMS Termagant

Minesweeper Group

4 Auk-class: Prevail, Seer, Dextrous, Pioneer
6 SC, 10 YMS, 8 British and 6 French AM, 2 LCC, 2 danlayers
1 minelayer: Barricade

Salvage and Firefighting Group

Fleet tug Hopi, 1 ATA, British tugs Empire Spitfire, Empire Ann, 1 boom vessel, 1 ATR, 1 YTB, 1 YTL, 1 FT

== Delta Force ==
Landings near St. Maxime, 15 August

=== Delta ground forces ===
45th Infantry "Thunderbird" Division

Major General William W. Eagles

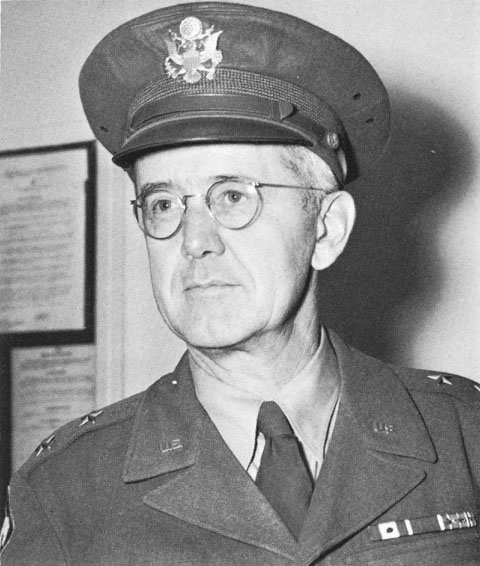
William W. Eagles

Organic units

HHC & Special Troops

45th Military Police Platoon
45th Signal Company
45th Quartermaster Company
45th Counter Intelligence Corps Detachment
45th Mechanized Reconnaissance Troop
700th Ordnance Light Maintenance Company
120th Engineer Combat Battalion
120th Medical Battalion

Infantry

157th Infantry Regiment
179th Infantry Regiment
180th Infantry Regiment

Artillery

158th Field Artillery Battalion (105mm Howitzer)
160th Field Artillery Battalion (105mm Howitzer)
171st Field Artillery Battalion (105mm Howitzer)
189th Field Artillery Battalion (155mm Howitzer)

45th Infantry Division Beach Group

40th Engineer Combat Regiment
4th Naval Beach Battalion
71st Signal Company (Special)
Detachment, 207th Signal Depot Company
Detachment, 177th Signal Repair Company
HQ & HQ Detachment, 58th Medical Battalion

388th Medical Collecting Company
389th Medical Collecting Company
390th Medical Collecting Company
514th Medical Clearing Company
2nd Platoon, 616th Clearing Company

Company B, 759th Military Police Battalion
1 Section, 377th Prisoner of War Escort Guard Company
Detachment, Boat Guards

133rd Provisional Prisoner of War Detachment
175th Provisional Prisoner of War Detachment
191st Provisional Prisoner of War Detachment

3rd Platoon, 21st Chemical Decontamination Company (Smoke Troops)
Detachment, 63rd Chemical Depot Company
2nd Platoon, 450th Engineer Depot Company
682nd Ordnance Ammunition Company
Detachment, 77th Ordnance Depot Company
Detachment, 977th Ordnance Depot Company
3487th Ordnance Medium Automotive Maintenance Company (DUKW)
3633rd Quartermaster Truck Company
Detachment, 6690th Regulating Company

HQ & HQ Detachment, 147th Quartermaster Battalion (Mobile)

829th Amphibian Truck Company
830th Amphibian Truck Company
831st Amphibian Truck Company
832nd Amphibian Truck Company

1 Section, 3894th Quartermaster Gas Supply Company
HQ & HQ Detachment, 240th Quartermaster Battalion

3250th Quartermaster Service Company
3251st Quartermaster Service Company
3252nd Quartermaster Service Company
3253rd Quartermaster Service Company
4053rd Quartermaster Service Company

Platoon, 94th Quartermaster Railhead Company
3425th Quartermaster Truck Company
Air Force Beach Detail
110th Beach Section, RAF

=== Delta naval forces ===
Task Force 85

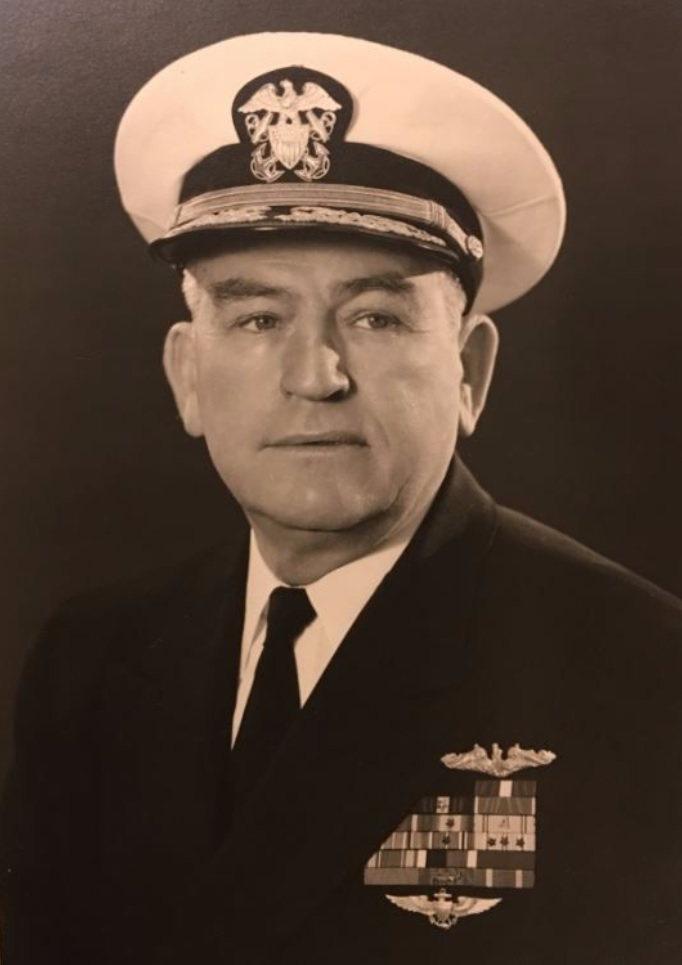
Rear Admiral Bertram J. Rodgers

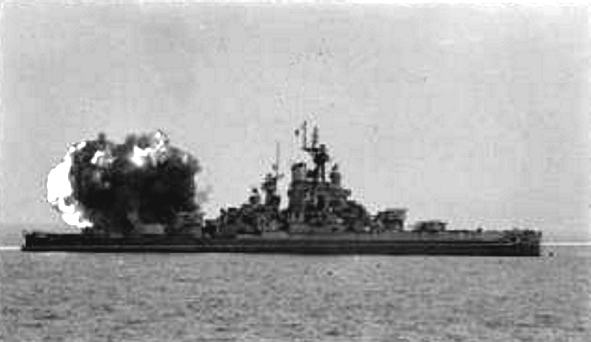
Battleship USS Nevada bombarding the French coast during Operation Dragoon

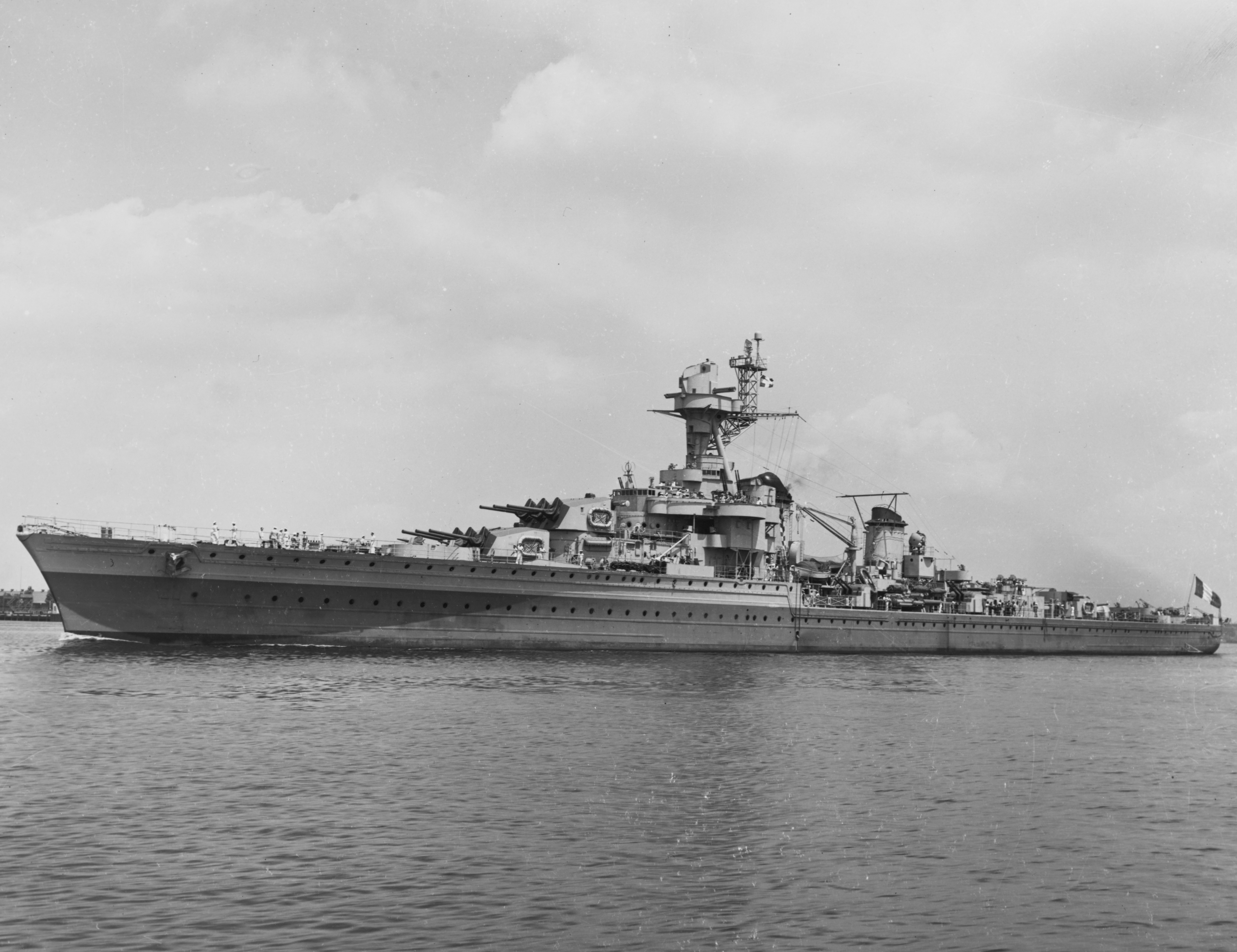
French light cruiser Montcalm

Rear Admiral Bertram J. Rodgers in amphibious force flagship Biscayne

Force Flagship Group

Force flagship: USS Biscayne
1 Gleaves-class (4 × 5-in. main battery) destroyer: USS Forrest
1 fighter-director tender

Transport Group (Captain R.A. Dierdorff)

6 transports: USS Elizabeth C. Stanton, Lyon, SS Marine Robin, SS Santa Rosa, Barnett, Joseph T. Dickman
2 attack freighters: USS Procyon, Arcturus
British LSP Dilwara, LSI HMS Ascania, Landing Ship Gantry RFA Ennerdale (carrying LCM).
3 destroyers

2 Gleaves-class (4 × 5-in. main battery): USS Baldwin, Carmick
1 Benson-class (5 × 5-in. main battery): USS Madison

2 Buckley-class destroyer escorts (3 × 3-in. main battery): USS Marsh, Haines

Assault Groups

Red Beach Assault Group: 10 LST, 6 LCI, 7 LCT, 1 LCG, I LCF, 4 LCS, 2 LCM(R), 2 SC, 2 LCC; 1 LCM
Green Beach Assault Group: 5 LST, 5 LCI, 7 LCT, 4 LCS, 2 LCM, 2 SC, 1 LCC
Yellow Beach Assault Group: 2 LST, 2 LCI, 26 LCVP, 4 LCS, 4 LCT, 3 LCM, 1 SC, 1 LCC
Blue Beach Assault Group: 1 LST, 26 LCVP, 16 LCT, 1 LCG, 1 LCF, 4 LCS, 3 LCM, 1 PC, 1 LCC, 1 LCI
Corps and Division Reserve Groups: 5 LST, 20 LCI, 18 LCT, I FT

Gunfire Support Group (Rear Admiral C.F. Bryant)

2 battleships: Texas, Nevada
1 light cruiser: Philadelphia
2 French light cruisers: Montcalm, Georges Leygues
8 Gleaves-class (4 × 5-in. main battery) destroyers: Ellyson, Hambleton, Rodman, Emmons, Macomb, Forrest, Fitch, Hobson
3 French large destroyers: Le Fantasque, Le Terrible, Le Malin

Minesweeper Group

8 minesweepers

2 Auk-class: Sway, Symbol
6 British: HMS Rinaldo, HMS Antares, HMS Arcturus, HMS Brave, HMS Rosario, HMS Spanker

2 danlayers: Satsa, Calm

Combat and Firefighting Group

5 fleet tugs: Narragansett, Pinto, HMS Aspirant, HMS Athlete, HMS Charon
1 ATA, 2 YTL

== Camel Force ==
Landings at St. Raphael, 15 August

=== Camel ground forces ===
36th Infantry "Arrowhead" Division

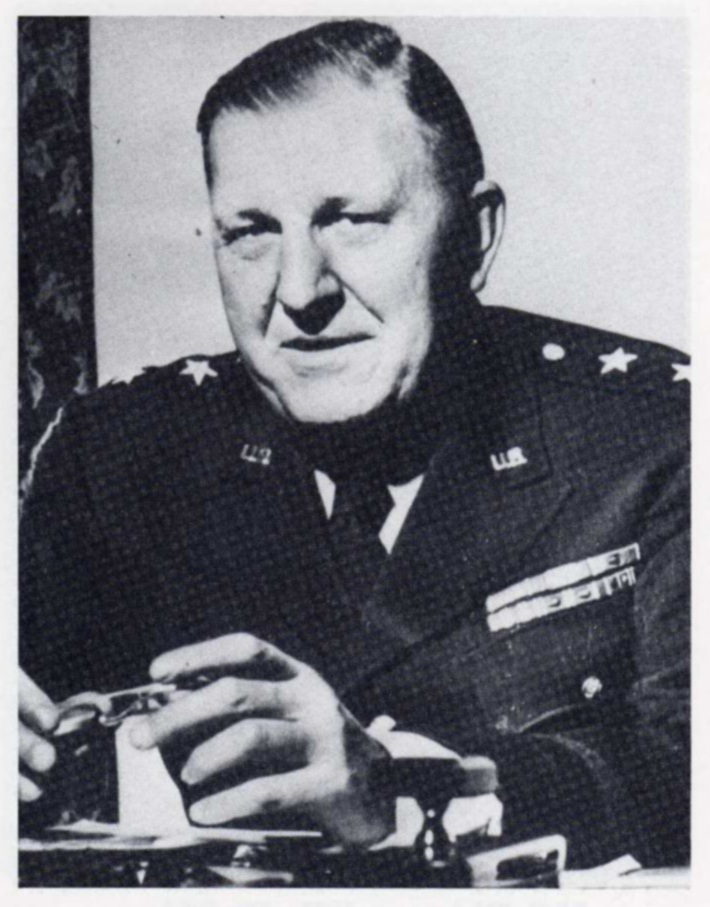
Maj. Gen. John E. Dahlquist

Major General John E. Dahlquist

Organic units

HHC & Special Troops

36th Military Police Platoon
36th Signal Company
36th Quartermaster Company
36th Counter Intelligence Corps Detachment
36th Mechanized Reconnaissance Troop
736th Ordnance Light Maintenance Company
111th Engineer Combat Battalion
111th Medical Battalion

Infantry

141st Infantry Regiment
142nd Infantry Regiment
143rd Infantry Regiment

Artillery

131st Field Artillery Battalion (105mm Howitzer)
132nd Field Artillery Battalion (105mm Howitzer)
133rd Field Artillery Battalion (105mm Howitzer)
155th Field Artillery Battalion (155mm Howitzer)

36th Infantry Division Beach Group

540th Engineer Combat Regiment
48th Engineer Combat Battalion
8th Naval Beach Battalion
74th Signal Company (Special)
Detachment, 207th Signal Depot Company
Detachment, 177th Signal Repair Company
HQ & HQ Detachment, 56th Medical Battalion

885th Medical Collecting Company
886th Medical Collecting Company
887th Medical Collecting Company
891st Medical Clearing Company
1st Platoon, 638th Clearing Company

Co. C, 759th Military Police Battalion
1 Section, 377th Prisoner of War Escort Guard Company
Detachment, Boat Guards

192nd Provisional Military Police Prisoner of War Detachment
601st Provisional Military Police Prisoner of War Detachment

3rd Platoon, 21st Chemical Decontamination Company (Smoke Troops)
Detachment, 63rd Chemical Depot Company
1st Platoon, 450th Engineer Depot Company
603rd Ordnance Ammunition Company
Detachment, 77th Ordnance Depot Company
Detachment, 977th Ordnance Depot Company
3405th Ordnance Medium Automotive Maintenance Company (DUKW)
Detachment, 6690th Regulating Company
1 Section, 3894th Quartermaster Gas Supply Company
2nd Platoon, 94th Quartermaster Railhead Co

HQ & HQ Detachment, 53rd Quartermaster Battalion (Mobile)

3337th Quartermaster Truck Company (DUKW)
3338th Quartermaster Truck Company (DUKW)
3339th Quartermaster Truck Company (DUKW)
3340th Quartermaster Truck Company (DUKW)
3354th Quartermaster Truck Company (DUKW)
3356th Quartermaster Truck Company (DUKW)

HQ & HQ Detachment, 259th Quartermaster Battalion

3286th Quartermaster Service Company
3287th Quartermaster Service Company
3288th Quartermaster Service Company
3289th Quartermaster Service Company
3299th Quartermaster Service Company
3300th Quartermaster Service Company

3427th Quartermaster Truck Company
3360th Quartermaster Truck Company
Air Force Beach Detail
111th Brick Section, RAF

=== Camel naval forces ===
Task Force 87

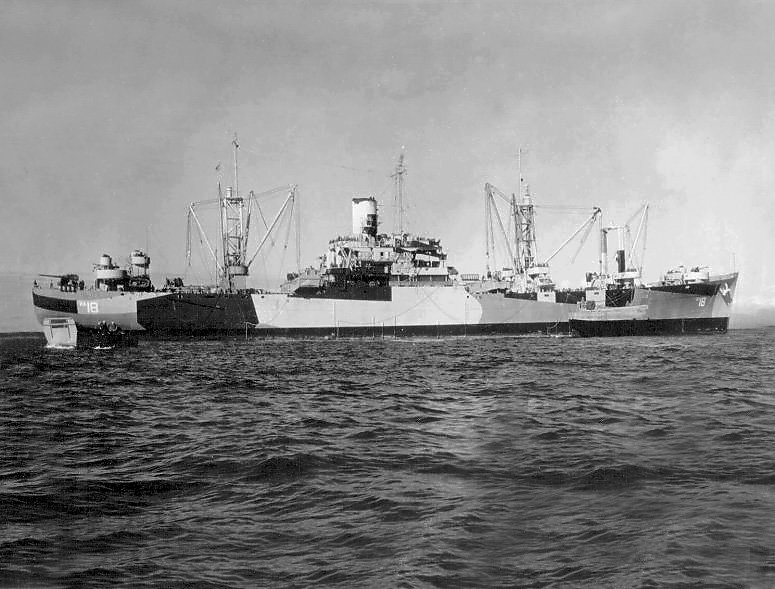
Attack cargo ship USS Cepheus

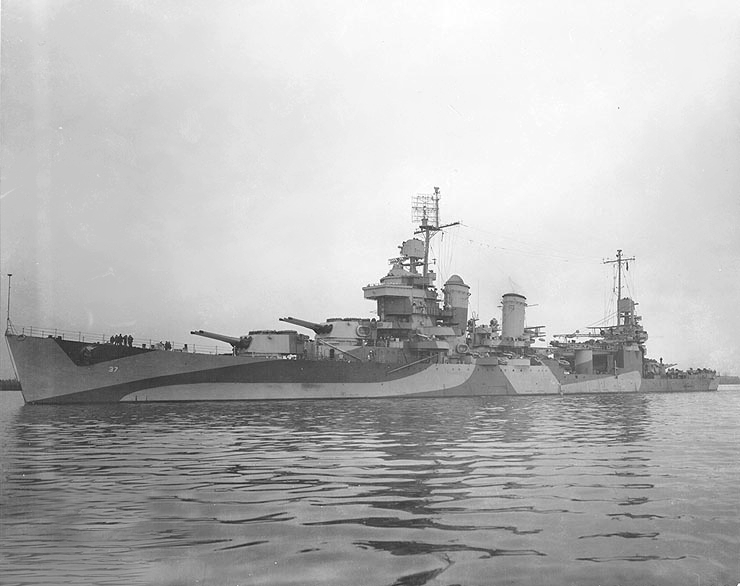
Heavy cruiser USS Tuscaloosa

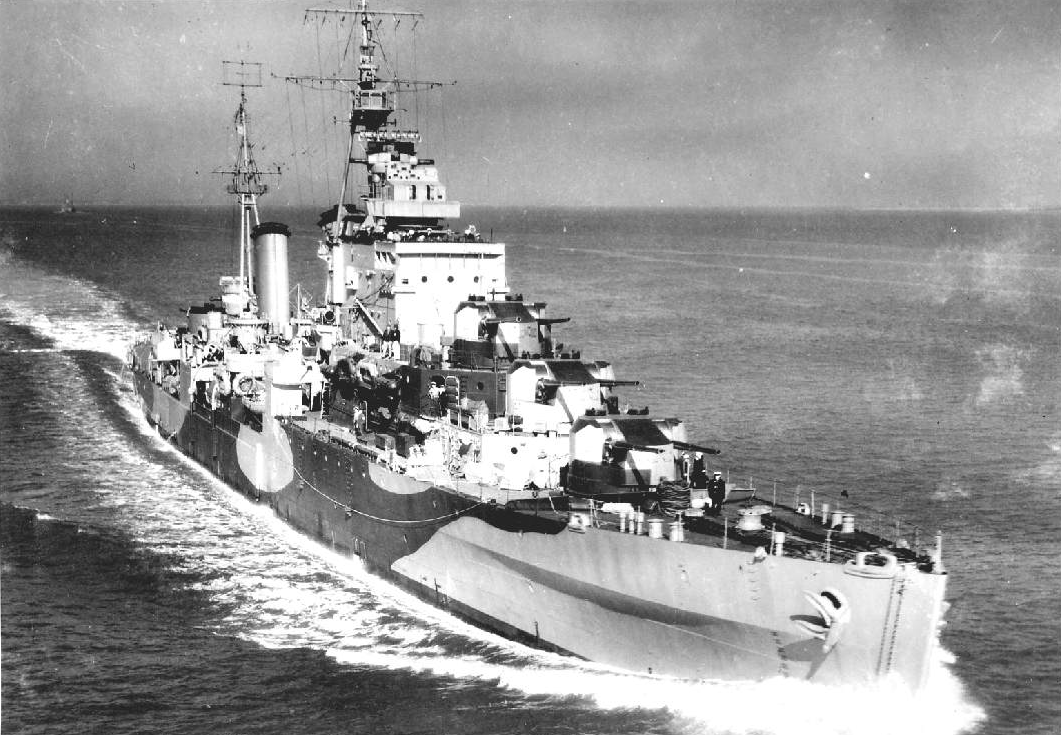
Light cruiser HMS Argonaut underway

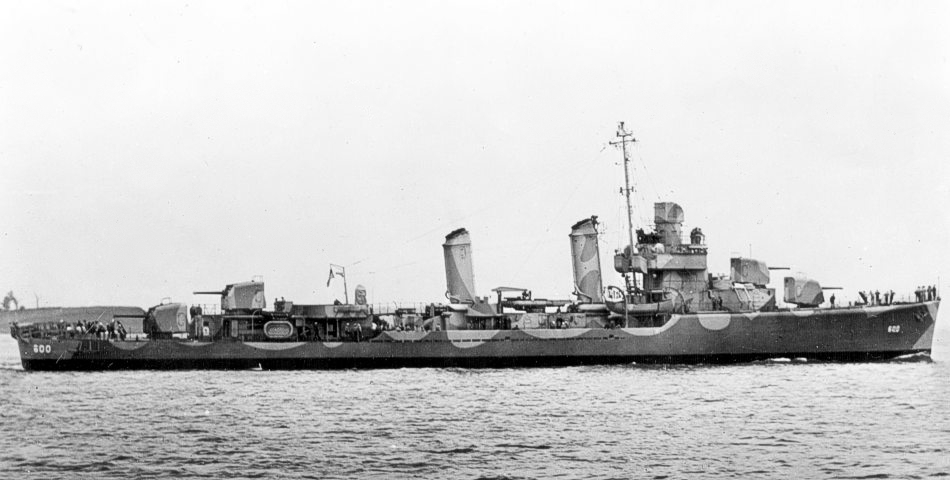
Destroyer USS Boyle

Rear Admiral Spencer S. Lewis

Force Flagship Group

1 attack transport: Bayfield
British LCH-3l5

Assault Groups

Red Beach Assault Group

2 attack transports: Charles Carroll, Thomas Jefferson
3 transports: Dorothea L. Dix, Florence Nightingale, General G. O. Squier
3 attack freighters: Cepheus, Achernar, Betelgeuse
5 LCI, 3 LST, 21 LCT, 20 LCVP, 9 LCS, 3 LCC, 1 LCG, 1 LCF, 2 LCM, 3 SC, 2 PC; 1 LSI (Br.), 1 LSD (Br.)

Green Beach Assault Group

23 LCI, I LCH, 14 LST, 21 LCT, 7 LCVP, 7 LCS, 3 LCC, 1 LCG, 1 LCF, 2 LCM, 2 PC, 2 SC

Blue Beach Assault Group

5 LST, 1 LCI, 3 LCS, 2 LCT, 2 SC, 1 PC

Escort and Screening Group

Destroyers from Bombardment Group
6 PC, 10 SC, 1 LST, 2 LCF, 1 LSF, 1 LCC, 5 LCS, 5 LCVP, 1 LCT, 2 LCM

Bombardment Group
Rear Admiral Morton L. Deyo

1 battleship: Arkansas
1 heavy cruiser: Tuscaloosa
5 light cruisers: Brooklyn, Marblehead, HMS Argonaut, French cruisers Duguay-Trouin, Émile Bertin
11 destroyers

8 Benson-class (5 × 5-in. main battery): Boyle, Champlin, Parker, Kendrick, MacKenzie, McLanahan, Nields, Ordronaux
3 Gleaves-class (4 × 5-in. main battery): Woolsey, Ludlow, Edison

Minesweeper Group

4 Auk-class: Strive, Steady, Speed, Sustain
6 YMS, 6 BYMS, 2 danlayers, 6 British ML, 12 British AM, HMS Product

Salvage and Firefighting Group

2 fleet ocean tugs: Moreno, Arikara
1 U.S., 2 British ATA, 1 YTB, 3 LCI, 1 LCT, 4 LCM, 1 boom vessel, 1 YTL

== Allied air forces ==
=== Mediterranean Allied Tactical Air Force ===
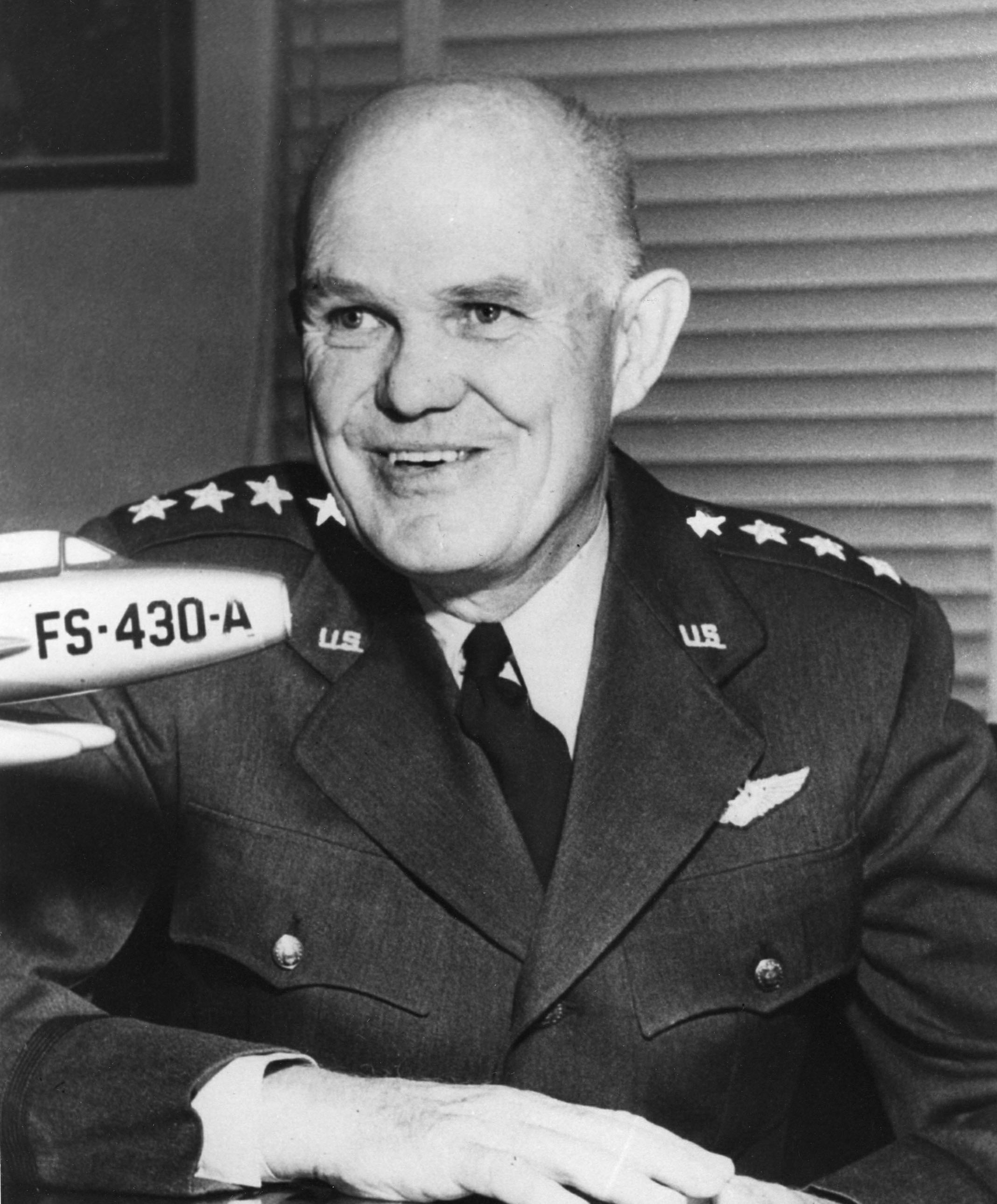
John K. Cannon as a full general

Major General John K. Cannon

==== XII Tactical Air Command ====
American Fighters

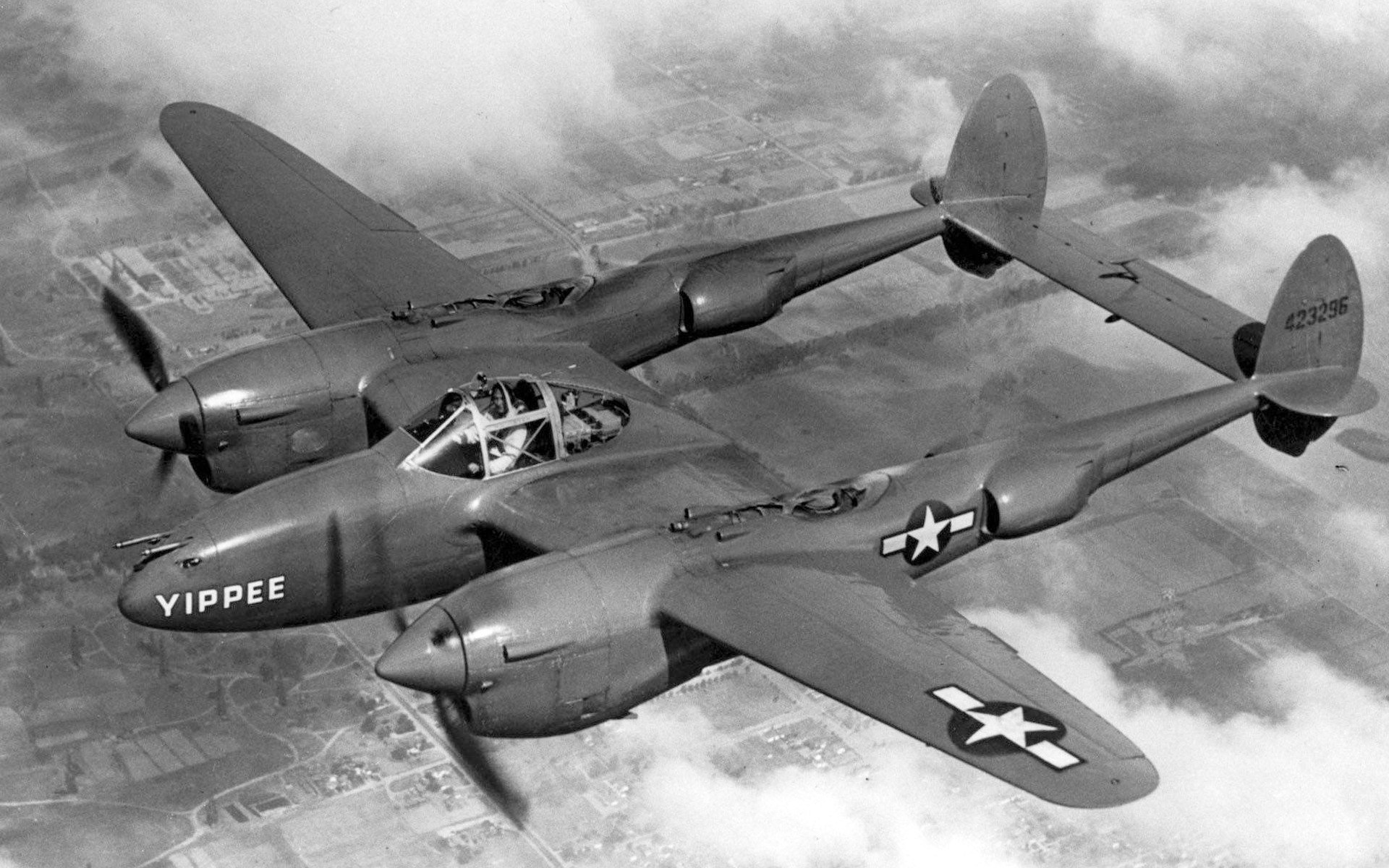
Lockheed P-38 Lightning

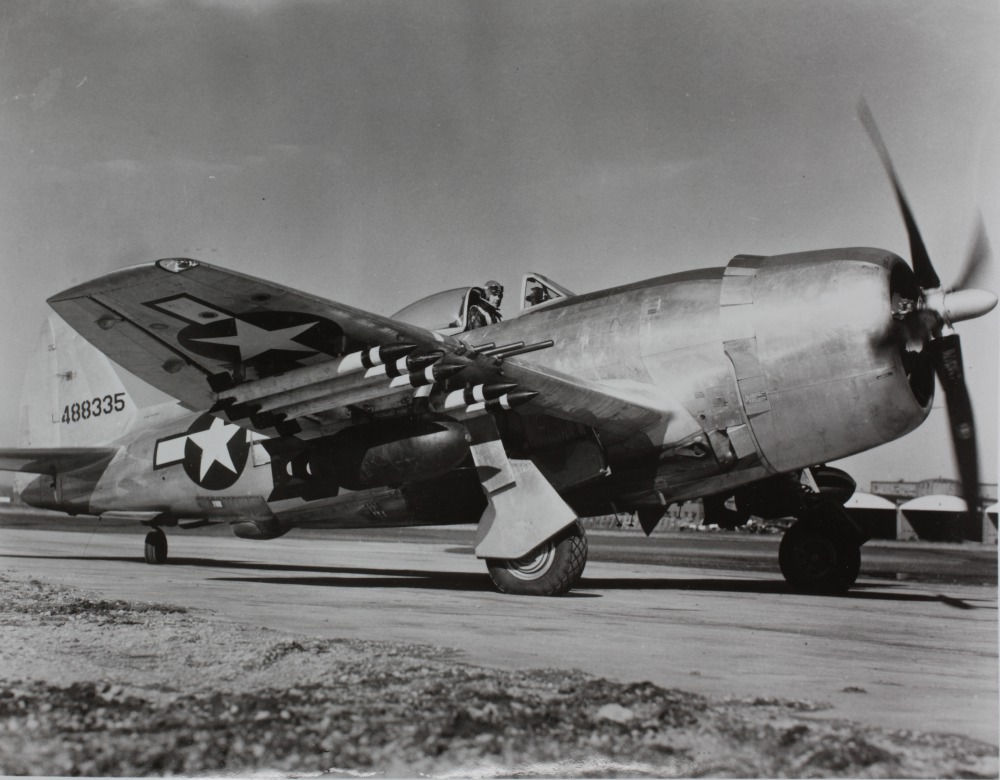
Republic P-47 Thunderbolt

British Fighters

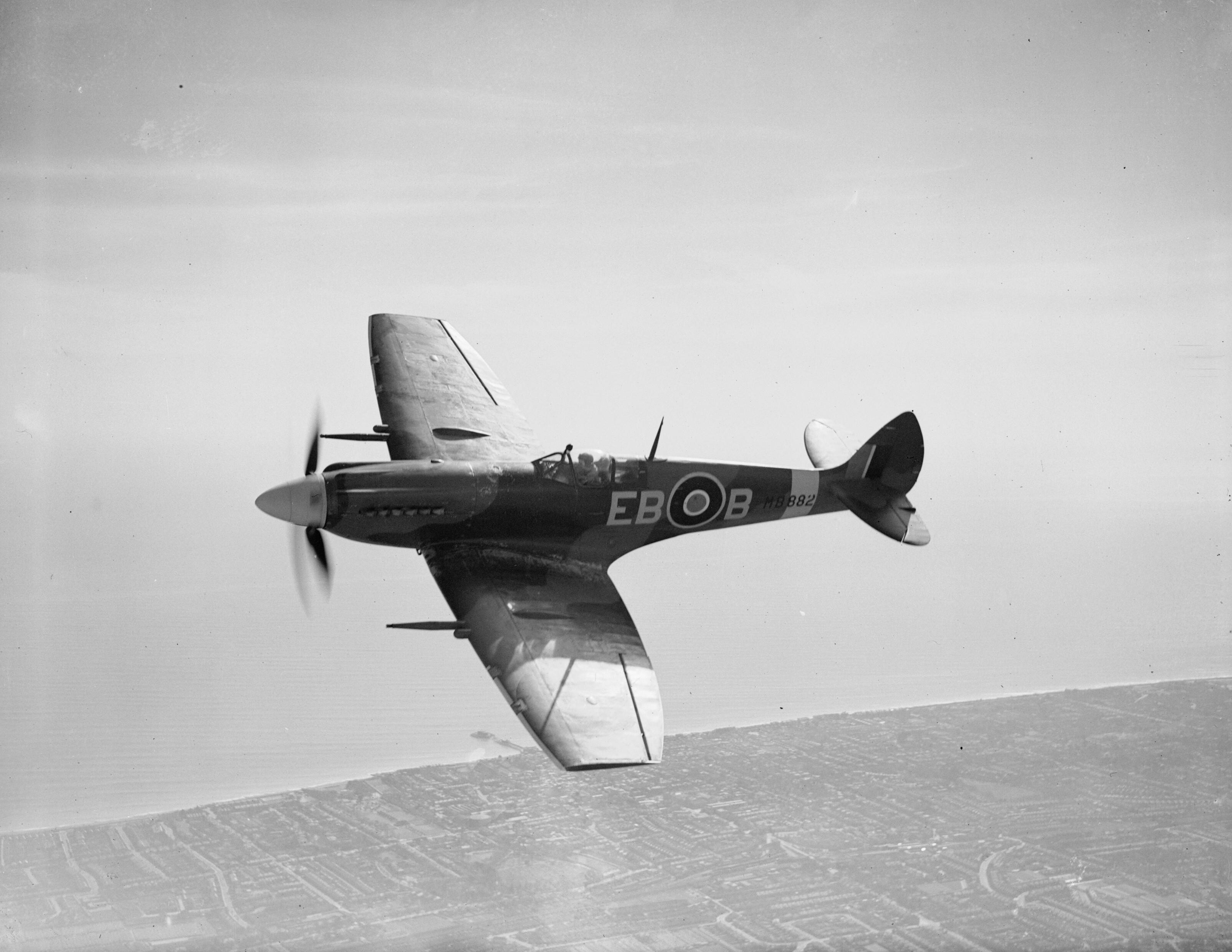
Supermarine Spitfire

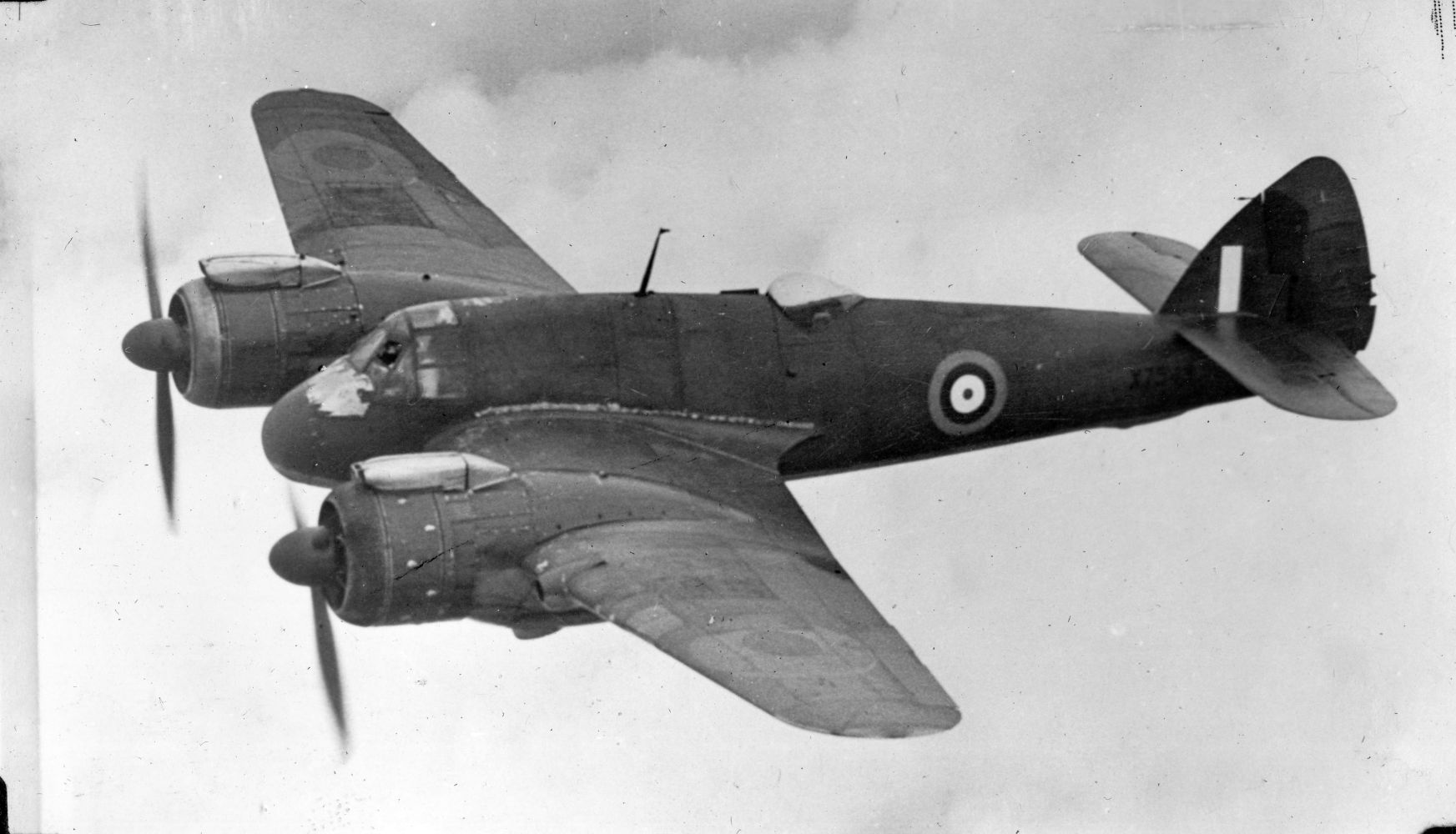
Bristol Beaufighter

Brigadier General Gordon P. Saville

1st Fighter Group (Lockheed P-38 Lightning) (on loan to MATAF 12–20 August 1944)
14th Fighter Group (P-38 Lightning) (on loan to MATAF 12–20 August 1944)
27th Fighter Group (Republic P-47 Thunderbolt)
57th Fighter Group (P-47 Thunderbolt)
79th Fighter Group (P-47 Thunderbolt)
86th Fighter Group (P-47 Thunderbolt)
324th Fighter Group (P-47 Thunderbolt)
No. 251 Wing RAF (Supermarine Spitfire IX)
No. 322 Wing RAF (Supermarine Spitfire IX)
No. 324 Wing RAF (Supermarine Spitfire IX)
47th Bombardment Group (Douglas A-20 Havoc)
111th Reconnaissance Squadron (F-6A Mustang)
415th Night Fighter Squadron (Beaufighter VI)
No. 225 Squadron RAF (Spitfire V)
II/33 Escadrille (Spitfire V)
Quartieme Escadre (P-47 Thunderbolt)
57th Bombardment Wing

310th Bombardment Group (North American B-25 Mitchell)
321st Bombardment Group (B-25 Mitchell)
340th Bombardment Group (B-25 Mitchell)
5th Photographic Reconnaissance Squadron (F-5 Lightning)
23d Photographic Reconnaissance Squadron (F-5 Lightning)
No. 682 Squadron RAF (Supermarine Spitfire XI)

42d Bombardment Wing

17th Bombardment Group Martin B-26 Marauder
319th Bombardment Group (B-26 Marauder)
320th Bombardment Group (B-26 Marauder)
31e Escadre (B-26 Marauder)

31st Fighter Group P-51 Mustang (Escorts for airborne operations)
325th Fighter Group P-51 Mustang (Escorts for airborne operations)

=== Mediterranean Allied Coastal Air Force ===
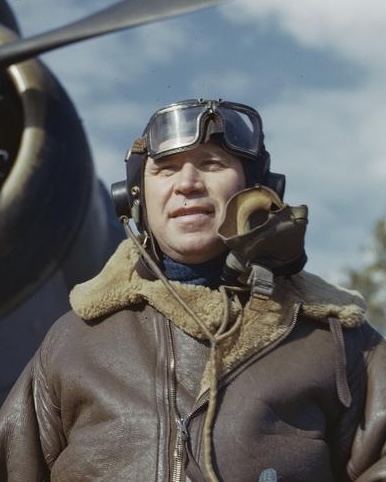
Air Vice-Marshall Hugh Pughe Lloyd

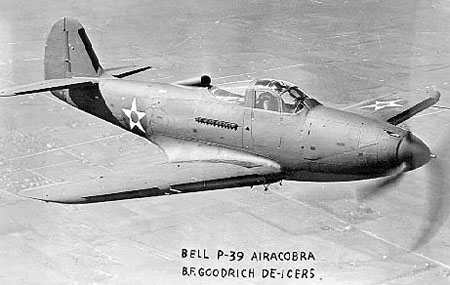
Bell P-39 Airacobra

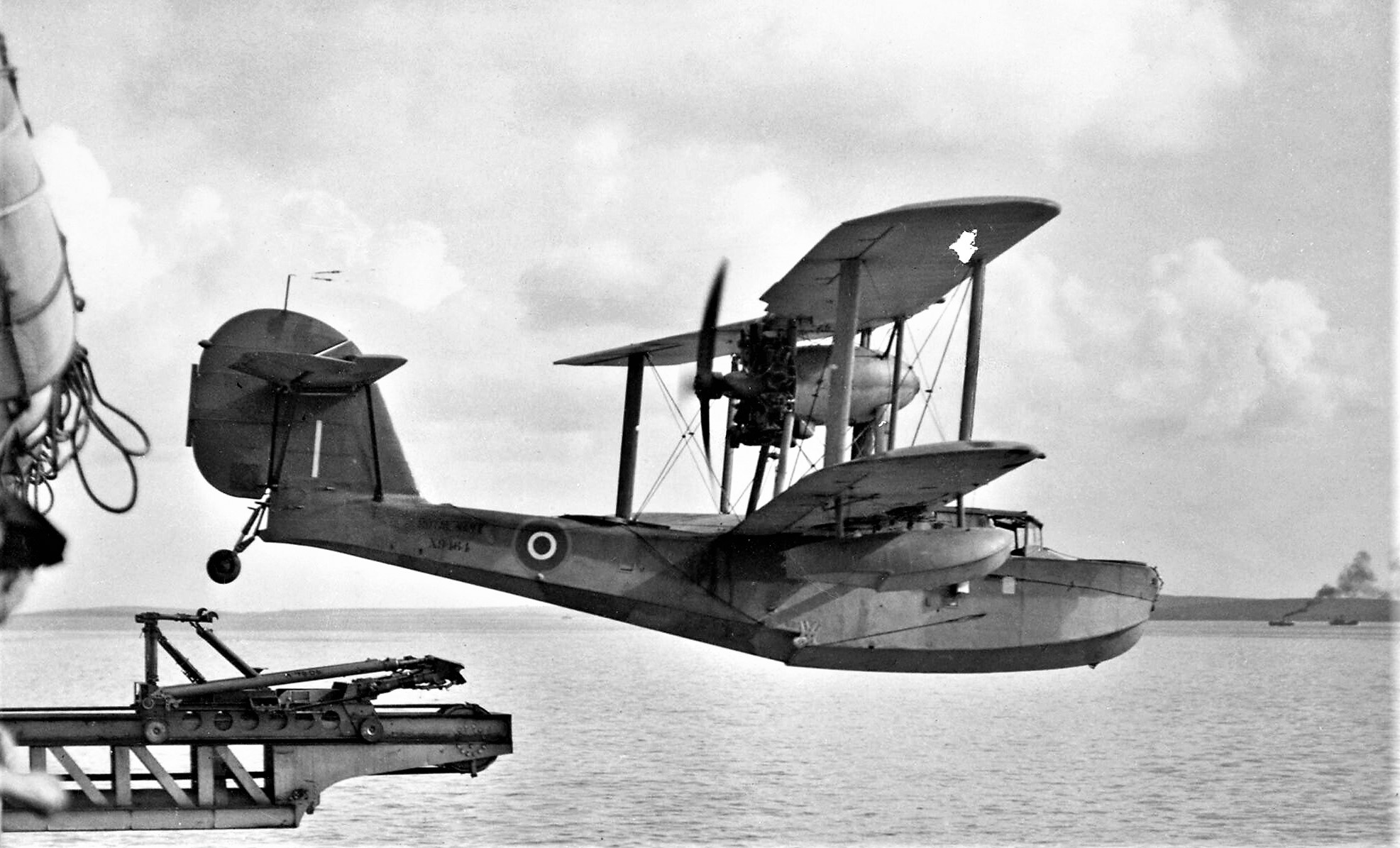
Supermarine Walrus launching from HMS Bermuda

Air Vice-Marshal Hugh Pughe Lloyd

63rd Fighter Wing

No. 326 (GC 2/7 Nice) (Spitfire V and IX)
No. 327 (GC 1/3 Corse) (Spitfire IX)
No. 328 (GC 1/7 Provence) (Spitfire V and IX)
417th Night Fighter Squadron (Beaufighter VI)
VOC-01 (Grumman F6F Hellcat, Grumman TBF Avenger)
350th Fighter Group

345th Fighter Squadron (Bell P-39 Airacobra)
346th Fighter Squadron (P-39 Airacobra)
347th Fighter Squadron (P-39 Airacobra)

No. 272 Squadron RAF (Beaufighter X)
414th Night Fighter Squadron (Beaufighter VI)
No. 256 Squadron RAF (Mosquito XII and XIII)
No. 153 Squadron RAF (Beaufighter VI)
No. 458 Squadron RAAF (Wellington XIV)
No. 36 Squadron RAF (Wellington XIV)
No. 17 Squadron SAAF (Lockheed Ventura V)
4S Squadron (Supermarine Walrus)
No. 14 Squadron RAF (Martin Marauder I, II and III)

=== Provisional Troop Carrier Air Division ===
Brig. Gen. Paul L. Williams

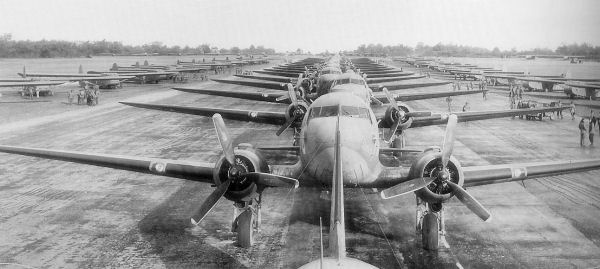
Row of Douglas C-47s in England

Brigadier General Paul L. Williams

50th Troop Carrier Wing (Douglas C-47 Skytrain)

439th Troop Carrier Group
440th Troop Carrier Group
441st Troop Carrier Group
442d Troop Carrier Group

51st Troop Carrier Wing (C-47 Skytrain)

60th Troop Carrier Group
62nd Troop Carrier Group
64th Troop Carrier Group

53rd Troop Carrier Wing (C-47 Skytrain)

435th Troop Carrier Group
436th Troop Carrier Group
437th Troop Carrier Group
438th Troop Carrier Group

== Axis forces ==
=== Army Group G ===
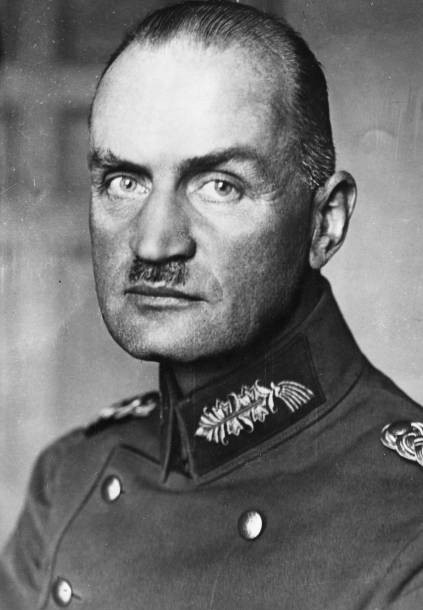
Generaloberst Johannes Blaskowitz

Generaloberst Johannes Blaskowitz

Nineteenth Army
General der Infanterie Friedrich Wiese

IV Luftwaffe Field Corps

716th Infantry Division
198th Infantry Division
189th Infantry Division

LXXXV Army Corps
General der Infanterie Baptist Knieß

338th Infantry Division (Generalleutnant René l'Homme de Courbiére)
244th Infantry Division (Generalleutnant Hans Schaefer)

LXII Army Corps
General der Infanterie Ferdinand Neuling

242nd Infantry Division (Generalleutnant Johannes Baessler)
148th Reserve Division (Generalmajor Otto Fretter-Pico)

LXIV Army Corps (Note: Swapped units with the IV Luftwaffe Corps in September.)

159th Infantry Division (Wehrmacht) as 159th Reserve Division

Army Reserve

11th Panzer Division (Generalmajor Wend von Wietersheim)
157th Reserve Division
158th Reserve Division (Note: In transition forming the 16th Infantry Division.)

=== Air forces ===
2nd Flieger-Division

=== Naval forces ===
Kommandierender Admiral der französische Südküste

6. Sicherungsflotille

== Sources ==
- Boog, Horst; Krebs, Gerhard; Vogel, Detlef (2006), Volume VII: The Strategic Air War and the War in the West and East Asia 1943–1944/5, Germany and the Second World War, Oxford: Clarendon Press, ISBN 0-19-822889-9, OCLC 316653140
- Gassend, Jean-Loup, ed. (2014), Operation Dragoon, Autopsy of a Battle, The Liberation of the French Riviera, Atglen PA: Schiffer, ISBN 9780764345807
- Goddard, William B., ed. (1988), Report of Operations: The United States Seventh Army in France and Germany 1944–1945, Nashville: Battery Press, ISBN 0-89839-124-5, OCLC 1896529
- Jackson, General Sir William; Gleave, Group Captain T. P. (1986), Butler, J.R.M (ed.), The Mediterranean and Middle East, History of the Second World War, United Kingdom Military Series, vol. VI Victory in the Mediterranean: Part II - June to October 1944, London: Her Majesty's Stationery Office, OCLC 59086236
- Morison, Samuel Eliot (1957), The Invasion of France and Germany, 1944–1945, Volume XI: History of United States Naval Operations in World War II, Boston: Little, Brown and Co., OCLC 7320755
- Warren, John C. (1955), Airborne Missions in the Mediterranean, 1942–1945 (PDF), Maxwell Air Force Base: US Air Force Historical Research Agency, OCLC 4117022, USAF Historical Study No. 74, archived from the original (PDF) on 22 July 2011
