= USS Marsh =

Buckley-class destroyer escort

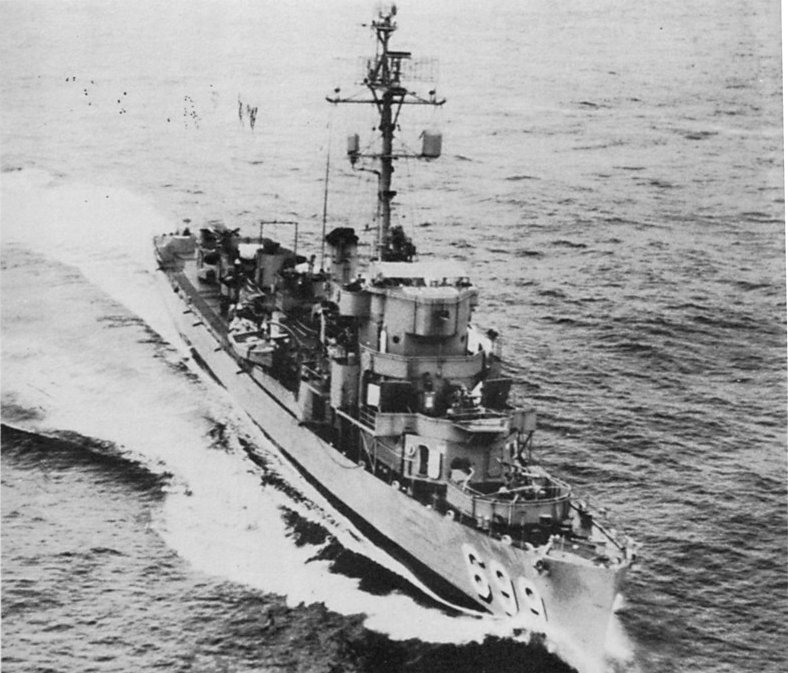
- USS Marsh

History

United States
- Name: USS Marsh
- Namesake: Benjamin R. Marsh, Jr.
- Ordered: 1942
- Builder: Defoe Shipbuilding Company, Bay City, Michigan
- Laid down: 23 June 1943
- Launched: 25 September 1943
- Commissioned: 12 January 1944
- Decommissioned: 1 August 1962
- Stricken: 15 April 1973
- Honors and awards: 1 battle star (World War II); 4 battle stars (Korea)
- Fate: Sold for scrap, 20 February 1974

General characteristics
- Class & type: Buckley-class destroyer escort
- Displacement: 1,400 long tons (1,422 t) light; 1,673 long tons (1,700 t) standard
- Length: 306 ft (93 m)
- Beam: 37 ft (11 m)
- Draft: 13 ft 6 in (4.11 m)
- Propulsion: Turbo-electric drive, 12,000 shp (8.9 MW); 2 shafts
- Speed: 24 knots (44 km/h; 28 mph)
- Complement: 186
- Armament: 3 × 3"/50 caliber guns; 1 × quad 1.1"/75 caliber gun; 8 × single 20 mm guns; 1 × triple 21 inch (533 mm) torpedo tubes; 8 × K-gun depth charge projectors; 2 × depth charge tracks

USS Marsh (DE-699) was a Buckley-class destroyer escort of the United States Navy.

The ship's namesake, Benjamin Raymond Marsh Jr., was killed aboard USS Arizona during the attack on Pearl Harbor on 7 December 1941.

== Construction and commissioning ==
Marsh was laid down on 23 June 1943 at the Defoe Shipbuilding Company in Bay City, Michigan. She was launched on 25 September 1943, sponsored by Mrs. Ben R. Marsh, mother of Ensign Marsh; and commissioned on 12 January 1944.

== World War II ==
Following a Bermuda shakedown cruise, Marsh conducted training exercises and escorted convoys along the northeast coast. On 25 March, she steamed from New York, heading for Plymouth, England, on her first trans-Atlantic convoy. She returned to the East Coast on 1 May, and on 23 May, sailed for the coast of North Africa. The destroyer escort accompanied two more convoys between those coasts before being assigned to the Mediterranean Theater. Entering the Mediterranean through the Strait of Gibraltar on 9 July, Marsh escorted convoys between North Africa, Malta, and southern Italy until mid-August. On 14 August, she sailed from Naples with the assault forces for "Operation Dragoon", the invasion of Southern France. She remained in the Mediterranean for the next month providing gunfire support and convoying supplies in the area.

With the successful establishment of another major crack in the crumbling front of the Third Reich, Marsh was reassigned to the Pacific. She departed Mers El Kébir, Algeria, on 28 September, transited the Panama Canal in mid-October, and arrived at Eniwetok on 20 December. For the next five months, she escorted convoys to Guam, Saipan, Ulithi, and Iwo Jima.

In May 1945, Marsh joined in the active pacification of bypassed islands in the Marianas. Broadcasting propaganda messages in Japanese and Okinawan, she sailed among the various islands of that group, including Asuncion, Anatahan, Alamagan, Sarigan, Maug, and Agrihan, taking on prisoners as they surrendered. Where the broadcasts were not successful, she escorted landing parties and provided gunfire support for the completion of their missions. By mid-July, resistance on some islands remained stiff. Marsh, flagship of the Northern Marianas Expeditionary Force, continued to lead her small force against the holdouts in order to provide safe-ditch areas for pilots returning to Allied bases from raids on the enemy's home islands. With the securing of the islands, weather stations and aircraft beacons were set up to further aid the pilots.

On 11 August, Marsh detached from the Expeditionary Force, and sailed for Okinawa. Resuming escort duties, she steamed back to the Marianas and then on to Tokyo. Departing Tokyo on 31 August, she sailed for Pearl Harbor, arriving there on 24 September. Then she took on equipment which transformed her into a mobile power unit. In this conversion, an electric generator and power cables replaced her torpedo tubes. With this new asset, she returned to Guam on 26 October to provide ship-to-shore power services until the end of the year.

== 1946–1952 ==
The destroyer-escort returned to the United States in early 1946 for shipyard overhaul at San Pedro, Los Angeles. On 16 May, she once again departed for the South Pacific. Arriving at Kwajalein on 31 May, she provided power to that island until September. During her tenure there, a slight mishap occurred. A group of sailors while on leave left the ship and proceeded to burglarize a large liquor storehouse that was on the island. They were discovered by Marine MP's that were stationed on the island. None of them were apprehended, but it is known that those who committed the robbery were from the Marsh because a small dinghy belonging to the Marine Detachment was stolen that night as well, and tied up alongside the destroyer. The officer in charge of the division claimed that it was theirs and that the liquor had been stolen by sailors on board the Marsh. The captain of the vessel staunchly denied the claims. No arrests were made and the small dinghy remained with the Marsh at least until 1947. She then sailed for Guam where she received orders for Tsingtao and Fusan, Korea where the 7th Fleet lent support to the aims of American policy in China and in the United States occupation zone of Korea.

Marsh returned to her home port, Pearl Harbor, on 31 March 1947, and for the next three years, operated in the Hawaiian Islands and off the coast of California, deploying in 1948 for two months duty at Eniwetok.

Her next Pacific deployment came after the invasion of South Korea by the Communists in June 1950. Marsh arrived at Yokosuka, Japan on 7 September, and departed on the 14th for Pusan, where she supplied power to the city for two weeks. On 9 October, she entered Inchon Harbor, and remained as support for that area's defense until the end of the month. She supplied power at Masan, a seaport on Chosen Strait, for a month starting on 9 November, then returned to Pusan where she remained as a ship-to-shore power unit for the remainder of her tour.

On 8 February 1951, at Pusan, several of her crew were credited with heroic actions in fighting fires which had broken out in the Army gasoline dump adjacent to the pier where the ship lay.

Returning to the West Coast on 26 March, Marsh remained at San Francisco for three months before reporting to the Fleet Sonar School at San Diego. Until April 1952, she conducted training exercises for the school and with other units of the fleet off the southern coast of California.

On 15 May 1952, Marsh once again joined the battle line off the Korean coast. She patrolled the west coast, operating primarily in the Sochon-Do area, until the end of May. She then steamed to Okinawa for hunter-killer exercises, returning to Korea on 21 June. Taking up aircraft carrier screen duties, she operated with Bataan (CVL-29) and HMS Ocean in the Yellow Sea. In July, she again headed south, this time to serve with the Formosa Patrol, then on 22 August, returned to the battle line. She patrolled off the west Korean coast initially, but was moved to the east coast in late September to blockade. She participated periodically in the shelling of troop and transportation centers in the Songin and Wonsan areas. On 22 October, she sailed again to the Korean coast where she conducted patrols until steaming for Yokosuka and the United States on 14 November.

The following is from the book "Thunder in the Morning Calm", Vanwell Publishing Limited, St. Catharines, Ontario, 1992, at pages 183–186.

The destroyer USS "Marsh" was engaged in shelling a railway tunnel on the east coast of Korea at a position known as Package One, on Thursday, 2 October 1952. Several times during the morning "Marsh" had moved further offshore after splashes from North Korean shore batteries seemed to fall too close. Eventually "Marsh" signalled for assistance and moved out of range.

At approximately 1300 hours HMCS "Iroquois" (a Royal Canadian Navy Tribal Class destroyer) arrived on the scene in response to the request for assistance. "Iroquois", who had bombarded this position before, commenced bombardment and continued for approximately two hours without interference from the shore batteries. At 1600 hours she discontinued shooting and commenced a slow starboard turn to seaward. Shore batteries commenced firing at that moment and one of two rounds fired hit "Iroquois" on "B" mount. "Iroquois" turrets were not fully enclosed and the entire gun's crew was knocked down with one sailor killed. The injured sailors stood up and the entire gun's crew, including the wounded, started reloading while "A" and "B" mounts re-engaged the shore batteries. Meanwhile, the engine room commenced making smoke and the ship sailed out of range.

From "Thunder in the Morning Calm" at page 184:

"USS "Marsh", meanwhile, had fled. Her officers had watched the duel between "Iroquois" and the shore batteries, but made no effort to intervene. "Marsh", whose duty it was to provide cover, had fired not a single shot. She had instead been taken quickly out of range. A photographer on her bridge had taken pictures of the action, but his were the only shots from "Marsh"."

HMCS "Iroquois" returned to Package One alone the next day. As she approached, the Chinese batteries opened fire. "Iroquois" kept firing and moving until a spotting plane announced that he could see no further targets. The RCN ships in Korea, from that moment on, rarely made requests for support; and those requests, whenever possible, excluded the ships of the USN. ("Thunder in the Morning Calm", page 185.)

== 1952–1961 ==
For the next five years, Marsh operated out of San Diego primarily with the Fleet Sonar School for six months, and served in the western Pacific for the remainder of each year. During these WestPac cruises, she conducted oceanographic survey tests concerned with the temperature and content of the waters of the Marianas, and the Marshalls in addition to her regular duties.

On 10 September 1957, Marsh entered the San Francisco Naval Shipyard for overhaul, then went in reserve. Before decommissioning, she conducted two cruises, one to Mexico and one to Hawaii. On 16 August 1958, she decommissioned at San Diego, but remained in service as an anti-submarine training ship of the Selected Reserve Forces. Based at Long Beach, California, she conducted training cruises for selected reserve crews and when they were not embarked served as a training ship for other Naval Reserve units in the Long Beach-Los Angeles area.

During the summer of 1961, Marsh and her reserve crew were ordered activated for a one-year period. She was recommissioned on 15 December, and on 6 January 1962, she sailed for her new home port, Pearl Harbor. On 10 February, she departed Hawaii for deployment in the western Pacific. Operating out of Subic Bay, Marsh conducted training exercises for and patrolled with units of the South Vietnamese Navy, from 18 March to 21 May. She returned to Long Beach on 17 July, and on 1 August, she was again placed in service, in reserve. Reassigned as a Naval Reserve training ship at the same time, she continued this duty into 1969.

== Military awards and honors ==
American Campaign Medal
Asiatic-Pacific Campaign Medal (with one bronze service star)
European-African-Middle Eastern Campaign Medal
World War II Victory Medal
Navy Occupation Service Medal
National Defense Service Medal (with one bronze service star)
Korean Service Medal (with four bronze service stars)
Armed Forces Expeditionary Medal
United Nations Korea Medal
Korean War Service Medal
