= USS Haines =

Buckley-class destroyer escort

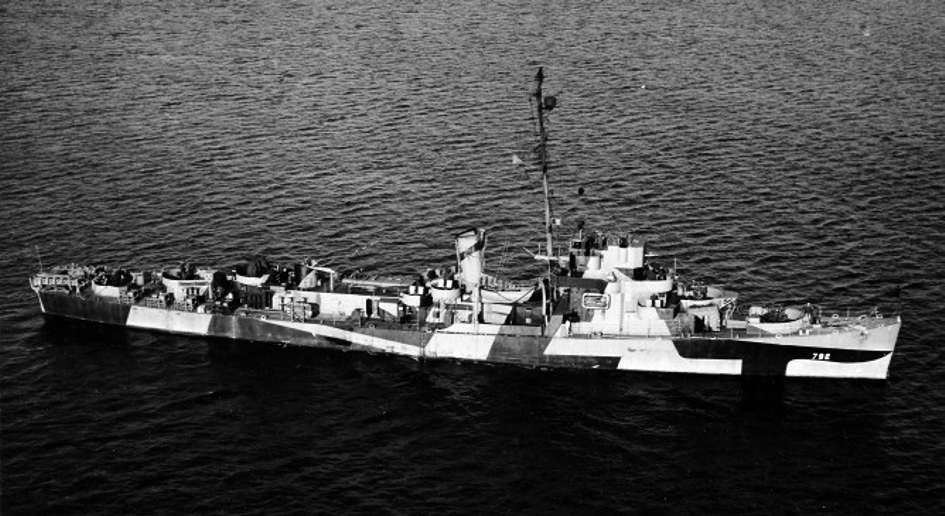

History

United States
- Name: USS Haines
- Builder: Consolidated Steel Corporation, Orange, Texas
- Laid down: 17 May 1943
- Launched: 26 August 1943
- Commissioned: 27 December 1943
- Decommissioned: 29 April 1946
- Reclassified: APD-84, 15 December 1944
- Stricken: 1 June 1960
- Honors and awards: 1 battle star (World War II)
- Fate: Sold for scrapping, 3 May 1961

General characteristics
- Class & type: Buckley-class destroyer escort
- Displacement: 1,400 long tons (1,422 t)
- Length: 306 ft (93 m)
- Beam: 37 ft (11 m)
- Draft: 12 ft (3.7 m)
- Speed: 22.5 knots (41.7 km/h; 25.9 mph)
- Complement: 186 officers and enlisted
- Armament: 1 × 5"/38 caliber dual-purpose gun; 3 × twin 40 mm guns; 6 × 20 mm guns; 2 × depth charge tracks

USS Haines (DE-792/APD-84) was a Buckley-class destroyer escort in service with the United States Navy from 1943 to 1946. She was scrapped in 1961.

== History ==
USS Haines was named in honor of Lieutenant Richard Alexander Haines, who served aboard the New Orleans (CA-32) when it suffered a devastating torpedo hit in the Battle of Tassafaronga on 30 November 1942. Lieutenant Haines remained at his station to assist in controlling the damage until overcome by asphyxiating gas generated by the explosion. He had given his life to save his shipmates and was posthumously awarded the Navy Cross for his heroism.

Haines was launched by Consolidated Steel Shipbuilding Corp., Orange, Texas, on 26 August 1943. Its construction was sponsored by Mrs. Mary V. Haines, wife of the ship's name sake. Haines was commissioned on 27 December 1943.

=== Battle of the Atlantic ===
Haines conducted shakedown training off Bermuda, and after final acceptance in February 1944, performed various duties until April. These included escorting a Dutch submarine to the United States from the Netherlands, sailing with a troop convoy to Panama and back, and serving as a training ship for new destroyer escort crews at Norfolk, Virginia. Early in April, Haines assumed duty as a target towing ship at Quonset Point, Rhode Island, where she helped ready young pilots for duty with American squadrons overseas.

Overseas duty was not long in coming for Haines. She was soon assigned to a Mediterranean convoy, leaving from New York and arriving at Casablanca on 7 June 1944. After returning to New York, Haines again sailed for the Mediterranean on 30 June 1944, this time with a carrier task group. The group paused at Malta before proceeding to Alexandria, Egypt to guard against the Axis attack on that port.

Detached from the task group, Haines next took an active part in the vast armada that invaded southern France. Departing Naples on 13 August, she escorted troop transports to the assault area, and later acted as a screening ship for the gunfire support group offshore. She also performed mine clearing in the port of Marseilles. Haines continued her escort duties into September as the Allied advance gained momentum, acting as escort to an LST group ferrying supplies from Corsica to France.

Haines completed her Mediterranean service on 1 November 1944 and sailed for the United States, via Oran. She arrived at New York on 11 December and immediately entered the Brooklyn Navy Yard for conversion into a high speed transport.

=== Pacific War ===
Completed on 1 March 1945, Haines was re-designated APD-84. She then served for several months at Norfolk and in Chesapeake Bay as a training ship for fast transport and destroyer escort crews.

Receiving orders to return to combat duty, Haines sailed from Norfolk for the Panama Canal on 8 August 1945. She received word of the war's end while at Cristóbal, Canal Zone and proceeded to San Diego, California, where she continued to Pearl Harbor in early September. Haines was then designated to transport units of the strategic bombing survey team. One of the more significant things the crew of the ship had done was doing a report of Hiroshima after the atomic bomb was dropped. Crew member Thomas Magnifico said "The only thing standing was a concrete smoke stack."

After extensive preparations, Haines departed from Guam for Japan on 2 October 1945. For the next two months, the ship stopped at various Japanese ports while technicians and analysts from the strategic bombing survey team gathered data on the effectiveness of the aerial bombardments. Haines departed Tokyo Bay on either 30 Nov or – more likely on 1 December 1945 filled with technicians who had participated in "USSBS" (U.S.Strategic Bomb Survey) and she arrived at Apra Harbor, Guam on 5 December 1945. David Keller, a prominent air gunner/photographer, was aboard. Haines was detached from this duty at Guam and departed on 6 December 1945, filled with returning Marines. She arrived at San Diego on 24 December 1945.

=== Decommissioning and fate ===
Scheduled for deactivation, Haines sailed for the East Coast via the Panama Canal, arriving in Boston on 12 January 1946. She subsequently sailed to Green Cove Springs, Florida, where she was decommissioned on 29 April 1946, and went into reserve. Haines was struck from the Navy List on 1 June 1960 and was sold for scrap to North American Smelting Co., on 19 May 1961.

== Awards ==
Haines was awarded one battle star for service in World War II
