= 938th Field Artillery Battalion (United States) =

United States military unit during WWII

- Insignia of the 938th Field Artillery
- Active: 1942–1945
- Country: United States
- Branch: United States Army
- Role: Artillery
- March: 938th Field Artillery Battalion March.
- Equipment: M1 155mm Howitzer
- Engagements: Rome-Arno Naples-Foggia Anzio Operation Dragoon Rhineland Central Europe

The 938th Field Artillery Battalion was an American United States Army field artillery unit that fought during World War II. The battalion was created on March 7, 1943, when the 166th Field Artillery of the Pennsylvania National Guard was split into multiple artillery battalions. It was equipped with the M1 155 mm howitzer.

The 938th departed the United States on August 21, 1943, for further staging in northern Africa and arrived in Oran on September 2. They returned home from the war on October 26, 1945. The battalion saw combat in Italy, Southern France, and Germany, and participated in Operation Shingle and Operation Dragoon

== Italian Campaign ==
After arriving in northern Africa three months earlier, the 938th headed for mainland Europe and landed in Naples on November 23, 1943. It was first in combat near Venafro, Italy on December 1.

While serving in the VI Corps within the Fifth Army, and attached to the French Expeditionary Corps, they engaged in continuous combat during the winter of 1943-44 as the Allied forces advanced toward the Winter Line.

While continuing up the Italian peninsula from Naples, Allied forces experienced ever increasing resistance from a determined German rearguard. Because of this, Allied commanders attempted to come up with another line of attack. The VI Corps was pulled off the line in preparation for an amphibious assault on Anzio.

=== Battle of Anzio ===
As the front came ever closer to stalemate, Allied commanders aimed to outflank German defenses by securing a strategic foothold behind enemy lines. On January 22, 1944, amphibious landings began at Anzio. The 938th participated in the assault and at the time was still part of VI Corps, attached to the 1st Armored Division. While at Anzio, the 938th's codename was "VOO DOO".

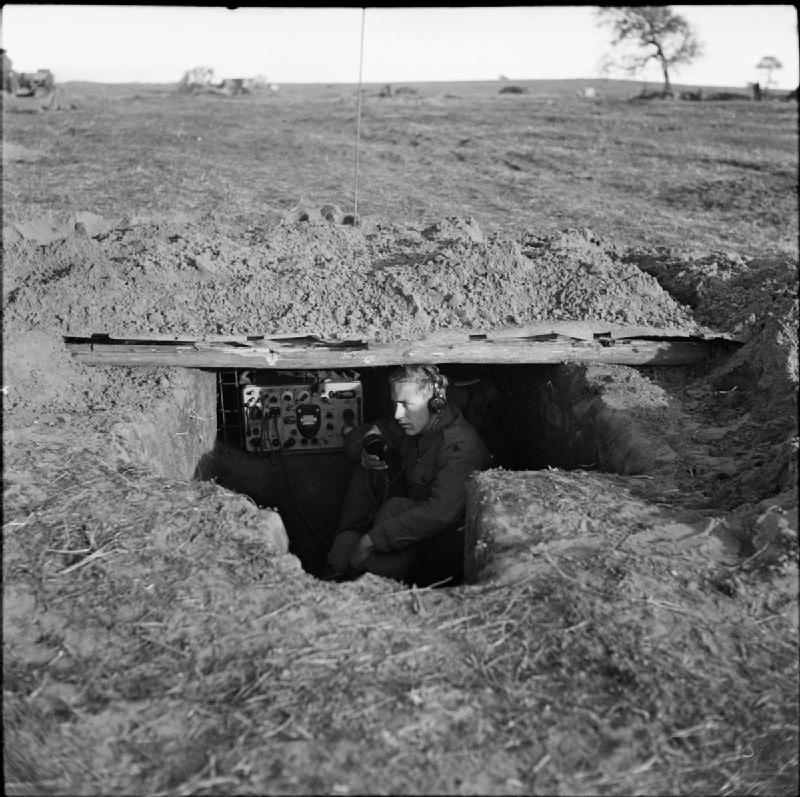
Example of a defensive position on the Anzio beachhead

After the landings, the Allied forces became bogged down in intense fighting, and instead of pressing forward, they opted for a defensive stance. The landings stalled and men were stuck on the beachhead. For the next several months the 938th and their comrades were stuck on the beachhead and forced into foxholes. Intense shelling and artillery exchanges were common, including being fired upon by the Krupp_K5, nicknamed by the soldiers as the "Anzio Express". In March 1944, the 938th was attached to the 45th Infantry.

By May 1944, the Allies were still unsuccessful in breaking out of the beachhead and commanders had an acute need to gain the upper hand. A plan was created to break the deadlock that had ensued after the initial landings. Operation Buffalo aimed to regain momentum by launching a coordinated offensive, pushing the Germans back and creating opportunities for a breakthrough, ultimately achieving the original objective of outflanking the Axis defenses and advancing towards Rome.

On May 23, still attached to the VI Corps, the 938th participated in the massive artillery salvo that commenced the opening stages of Operation Buffalo. This initial barrage is described as:

By mid-May 1944, Allied strength at the Anzio beachhead reached 150,000 men (two British divisions and five US divisions). At 0545 hours on 23 May, 1,500 Allied artillery pieces bombarded German lines for 40 minutes, thus commencing a new Allied attempt at breaking out of the Anzio beachhead. The main assault toward Campoleone, Velletri, and Cisterna was conducted by US 45th Infantry Division, US 1st Armored Division, and US 3rd Infantry Division, which were guarded by German 362nd Infantry Division and 715th Infantry Division; the first day of action was costly on both sides, but the 50% casualty rate suffered by the two German divisions would prove to be fatal. — Peter Chen, Battle of Anzio,

The U.S. Fifth Army, under the command of Lieutenant General Mark W. Clark, led the charge towards Rome. In the first days of the breakout from the beachhead, the 938th made it to made it to Cisterna. By the end of May, they were again fighting near the 45th Infantry still as part of the VI Corps. On June 5 the 938th made it to Rome and crossed the Tiber on the 6th. After capturing Rome, the Allies pursued the retreating Germans northwards. Just days later, the VI Corps was pulled off the front line for rest and refit.

== Operation Dragoon ==
The ports made available due to the success of Operation Overlord were not enough to adequately supply the Allied war effort. Because of this, Allied commanders decided to invade southern France near two important port cities, Marseille and Toulon, in order to increase the flow of necessary arms, munitions, and supplies to the front. At the beginning of the operation, the 938th was attached to the 45th Infantry and was still part of the VI Corps which had been moved to the Seventh Army under the command of Alexander Patch.

For the first months of the operation, the battalion stayed attached to the 45th Infantry. In November 1944, they were attached to the 100th Infantry with the explicit mission to “Reinforce fires of 100th Infantry Division Artillery. Establish a liaison with XV Corps Artillery"

The Seventh Army made rapid progress in France against the Axis defenders, pushing them further north. On September 10, 1944, the Seventh Army and the Third Army, under the command of George S. Patton, met near Dijon, France, creating a unified front against the retreating Germans and setting the stage for the upcoming Battle of the Bulge.

On February 5, 1945, the battalion reached its 365th day of combat.

In the closing months of the war, the battalion fought through eastern France and into Germany with various infantry and armored divisions, including the 36th, 44th, 100th, and 103rd Infantry Divisions, French forces (including Moroccan infantry), and the 10th Armored.

== End of the War ==
The 938th was in Füssen when the war ended. At that time, the battalion had seen well over 365 days of combat. During the war, the battalion suffered 87 wounded in action, and 17 killed in action. The highest award given to a member of the 938th was the Silver Star.

After serving as an occupation force for two months, the battalion left for home from Marseille on October 16, 1945, and arrived in the United States on October 26. The 938th Field Artillery Battalion was then deactivated at Camp Patrick Henry that same day.
