= Defense of Katowice =

Battle for control of Katowice, Poland, in 1939

- Part of Invasion of Poland
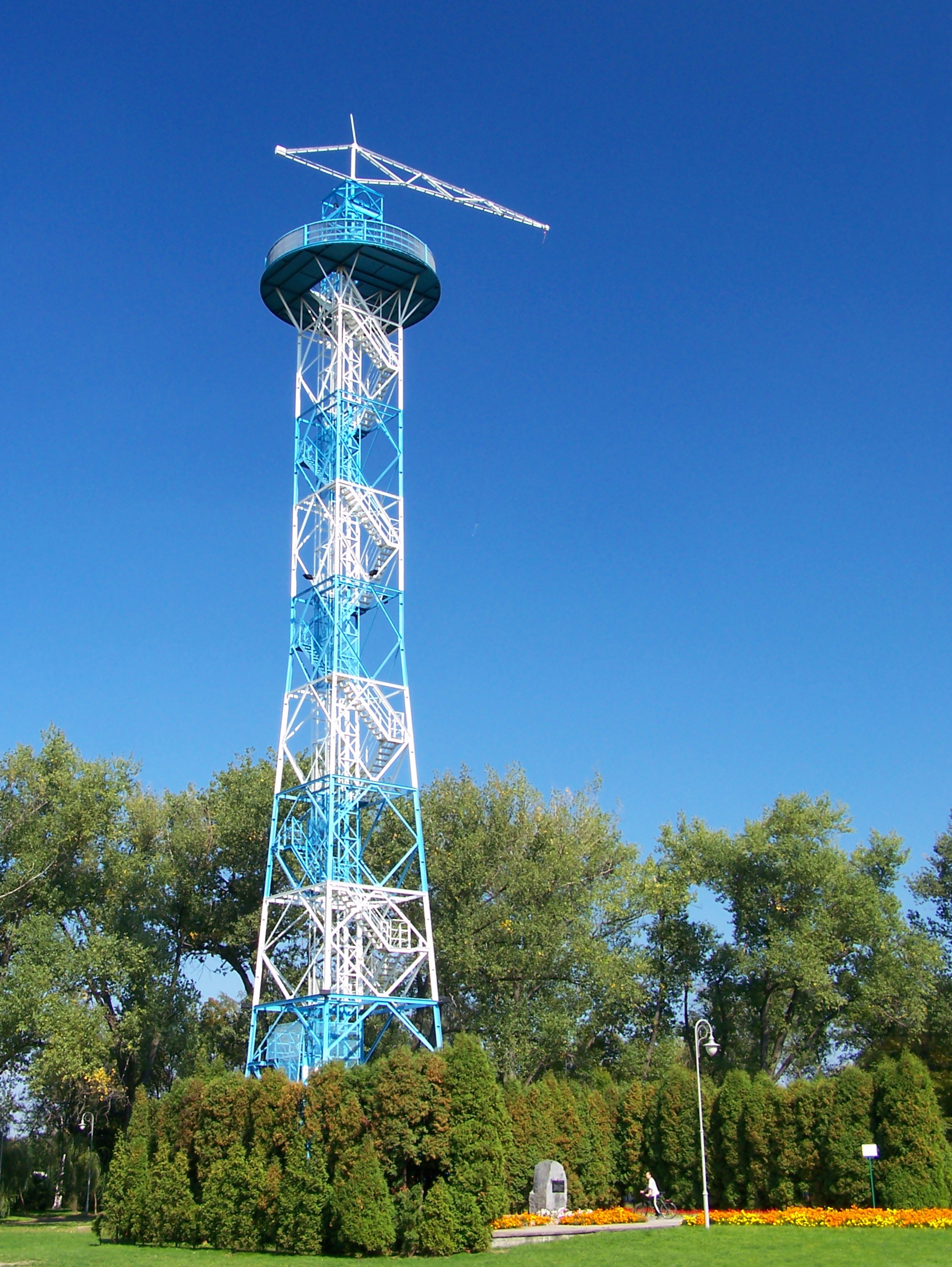
- The Parachute Tower Katowice became one of the iconic symbols of the city's defense.
Date	3–4 September 1939
Location	Katowice, Silesian Voivodeship, Poland
Result	German victory

Belligerents
(Nazi Germany) Germany	(Second Polish Republic) Poland

Commanders and leaders
(Nazi Germany) Ferdinand Neuling	(Second Polish Republic) Jan Faska

Strength
Several thousand soldiers	Several hundred militia volunteers

Casualties and losses
15 killed	150

The Defense of Katowice (Polish: Obrona Katowic) was carried out by small groups of irregular Polish militia on 3–4 September 1939 during the German invasion of Poland. German troops secured the city by the end of 4 September.

== Background ==
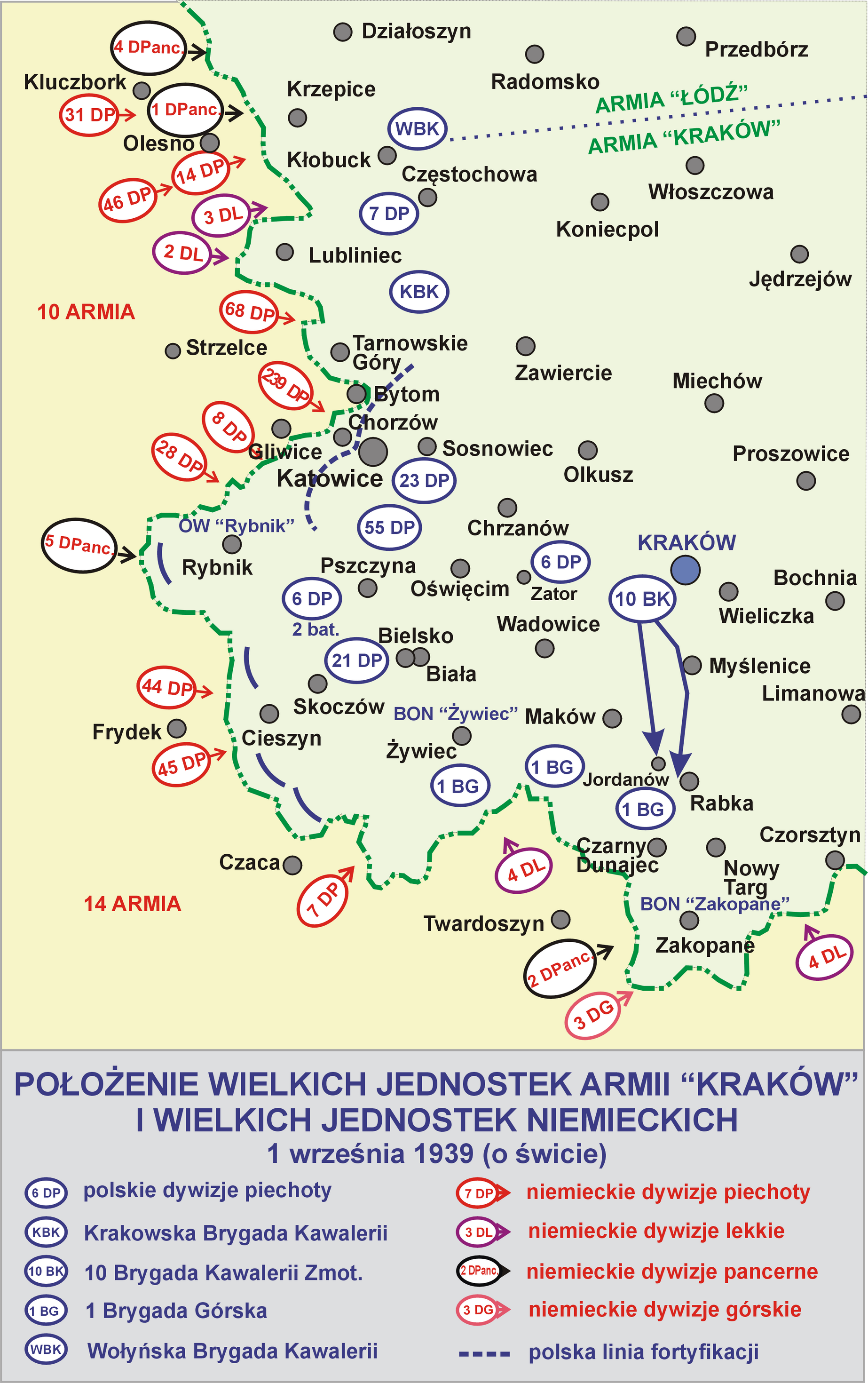
Positions of Polish and German forces in Silesia before the war began

The town of Katowice was located close to the Polish-German border at the time. Given the growing Polish–German tensions, local Polish activists, mainly former Silesian insurgents and youths from the Polish Boy and Girl Scouting, started to organize self-defense militia units by the end of August 1939. The Polish militia commander from 1 September was Jan Faska. The town was within the operational area of the Polish Kraków Army, but the Polish Army high command decided to abandon the city, with government officials, police forces, regular army units and some support formations, including elements of local militia, evacuating by 2 September, with some militia retreating on the following day.

The German forces converging on the city included the 8th Panzer Division, the 239 Infantry Division of General Ferdinand Neuling and the 28th Jäger Division, as well as the German border guard units from Grenzschutz Abschnittskommando and German militia Freikorps (Freikorps Ebbinghaus) units. Katowice's Muchowiec Airport was bombed on 1 September.

The Battle of Mikołów occurred in the vicinity of Katowice on 1–2 September.

== The defense ==
German forces appeared in the vicinity of the city on 3 September and some early clashes most likely took part on that day. The German forces that took the city on 4 September only had to deal with some remaining irregular Polish self-defense militia units, who either refused to evacuate or were unaware of the orders from the Polish army command. German soldiers reported being shot at in a number of incidents, suffering about 15 total fatalities in the process of securing the city. The most notable incidents involved the defense of the Silesian Insurgent House (the headquarters of the Polish militia), as well as a group of Polish Boy and Girl Scouts shooting Germans troops from the vantage point of the Parachute Tower Katowice. In the latter incident, witness reports suggest at least ten fatalities among the defenders, and several defenders might also have been taken prisoner. The defense of the Parachute Tower became also the best remembered incidents of the defense of Katowice and has been describe as "legendary". Other militia strongholds included the city's first skyscraper, Drapacz Chmur, and the Silesian Theatre; there were also militia units in the towers of local churches, in the Silesian Museum in the city center and other locales. A small number of rearguard units or stragglers from the 73rd Polish Infantry Regiment of the Polish 23rd Infantry Division also participated in fighting Germans in Katowice on that day, with several soldiers killed, wounded or taken prisoner. The German advance on the city began on the morning of 4 September and they gained control of the town within a few hours.

== Aftermath ==
In the aftermath of the battle, the Germans executed over 80 prisoners, namely people wearing insurgent or scouting uniforms. Total Polish casualties for that day from fighting and follow-up executions are estimated at 150. An unknown number of people were arrested, with some being executed over the following weeks.

Einsatzgruppen units were also active in Katowice and Silesia, and one of their standing orders was to summarily execute all identified former Polish insurgents . One of the first actions of the Germans after taking the town was the destruction of the Great Synagogue (on 8 September).

== Remembrance ==
In 1961, the Defenders of Katowice Monument was unveiled. On 4 September 1983, a September Scouts Monument in Katowice was unveiled in Katowice, commemorating the Polish Boy Scouts who were killed during the defense of Katowice. There are also individual and mass graves, as well as several memorial plaques dedicated to the victims of the defense of Katowice, including those who had been executed. During anniversaries of World War II a number of those monuments are visited by government officials and activists.

== See also ==
- List of World War II military equipment of Poland
- List of German military equipment of World War II
