= 19th Army (Wehrmacht) =

- German: 19. Armee
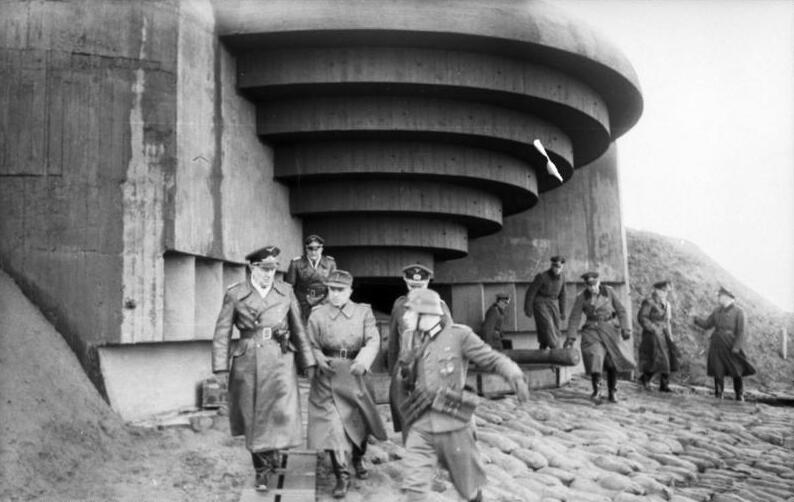
- 1944, anti-tank fortifications in Southern France
- Active: 26 August 1943 – 21 April 1945
- Country: Germany
- Branch: German Army ( Wehrmacht)
- Type: Field army
- Engagements: Western Front of World War II; Operation Dragoon; Colmar Pocket

The 19th Army (German: 19. Armee) was a World War II field army of the German Army. Active from 1943 to 1945 on the Western Front, it was tasked with defending southern France before being pushed back to the French–German border during Operation Dragoon and then into southern Germany.

== History ==
Formed in August 1943 in occupied southern France from Armeegruppe Felber (the LXXXIII. Armeekorps), the 19th Army defended southern France, the Vosges Mountains, Alsace, Baden and southern Württemberg during the Allied invasion of southern France and other large Allied military operations that had as their goal the liberation of southern France and the invasion of southern Germany.

Although nominally a field army, the 19th Army was under strength and consisted of third tier soldiers, wounded veterans, conscripts and Hiwis. Southern France in general was treated as a third tier theatre and given minimal attention by the OKW. The entire army was outfitted with damaged and obsolete equipment, with four of the 19th army's divisions designated "static divisions," meaning that they were stripped of all mobile assets and forbidden to move from their assigned positions. The Hiwis in particular proved unreliable and typically deserted or surrendered at the first opportunity. One of those units subordinated to the 19th Army was the 30th Waffen Grenadier Division of the SS, before it was withdrawn to Germany in December 1944 after sustaining heavy losses.

At the time of the Allied landings in Normandy on 6 June 1944, the 19th Army was headquartered at Avignon and subordinate to Army Group G at Toulouse.

During Operation Dragoon, the 19th Army was trapped in an enormous encirclement, suffering 7,000 killed or missing, 20,000 wounded, 130,000-140,000 captured and was largely destroyed as a fighting force. However, its headquarters survived intact, retreated northwards and participated in the defense of the Rhine River.

Organization: 19th Army on July 17, 1944
Army Group	Army	Corps	Division
G Blaskowitz	19th Army; Wiese	LXII Corps; Neuling	148th Infantry Division
G Blaskowitz	19th Army; Wiese	LXII Corps; Neuling	242nd Infantry Division
G Blaskowitz	19th Army; Wiese	LXXXV Corps; Knieß	244th Infantry Division
G Blaskowitz	19th Army; Wiese	LXXXV Corps; Knieß	338th Infantry Division
G Blaskowitz	19th Army; Wiese	IV Luftwaffe Corps; Petersen	189th Infantry Division
G Blaskowitz	19th Army; Wiese	IV Luftwaffe Corps; Petersen	198th Infantry Division
G Blaskowitz	19th Army; Wiese	IV Luftwaffe Corps; Petersen	716th Infantry Division
G Blaskowitz	19th Army; Wiese	Subordinated to Army HQ	157th Reserve (Mountain) Division

After the debacle in Southern France, the 19th Army was recreated with poorly trained conscripts and tasked with defending the west bank of the Rhine, and the city of Strasbourg. The 19th Army was again encircled and largely destroyed during the battle for the Colmar Pocket in January and February 1945. Once again its headquarters survived capture and was rebuilt largely from Volkssturm and hastily trained replacement troops in early 1945. With many of its best men and junior leaders dead or captured, the 19th Army's effectiveness was seriously impaired and it proved unable to parry the thrusts of its constant foe, the French First Army. Split by deep French armored thrusts into Baden, the Black Forest, and Württemberg, the 19th Army was destroyed in the area of Stuttgart and Münsingen in late April 1945, with remnants of the army surrendering as late as 8 May 1945. Formal surrender was accepted by Maj. General Edward H. Brooks, Commander of the U.S. Army's VI Corps.

Location of corps of the 19th Army
April 19, 1945

Organization: 19th Army on April 12, 1945
Army Group	Army	Corps	Division
G Schulz	19th Army; Brandenberger	XVIII SS Corps; Keppler	Baur Infantry Brigade
G Schulz	19th Army; Brandenberger	XVIII SS Corps; Keppler	1005th Infantry Brigade
G Schulz	19th Army; Brandenberger	XVIII SS Corps; Keppler	805th Infantry Division
G Schulz	19th Army; Brandenberger	XVIII SS Corps; Keppler	405th Infantry Division
G Schulz	19th Army; Brandenberger	LXIV Corps; Grimmeiß	106th Infantry Division
G Schulz	19th Army; Brandenberger	LXIV Corps; Grimmeiß	257th Volksgrenadier Division
G Schulz	19th Army; Brandenberger	LXIV Corps; Grimmeiß	716th Infantry Division
G Schulz	19th Army; Brandenberger	LXXX Corps; Beyer	16th Volksgrenadier Division
G Schulz	19th Army; Brandenberger	LXXX Corps; Beyer	47th Volksgrenadier Division
G Schulz	19th Army; Brandenberger	LXXX Corps; Beyer	198th Infantry Division
G Schulz	19th Army; Brandenberger	LXXX Corps; Beyer	559th Volksgrenadier Division
G Schulz	19th Army; Brandenberger	Subordinated to Army HQ	189th Infantry Division

== Commanders ==
No.	Portrait	Commander	Took office	Left office	Time in office
1	Georg von Sodenstern	General der Infanterie; Georg von Sodenstern (1889–1955)	26 August 1943	29 June 1944	308 days
2	Friedrich Wiese	General der Infanterie; Friedrich Wiese (1892–1975)	29 June 1944	15 December 1944	169 days
3	Siegfried Rasp	General der Infanterie; Siegfried Rasp (1898–1968)	15 December 1944	15 February 1945	62 days
4	Hermann Foertsch	General der Infanterie; Hermann Foertsch (1895–1961)	15 February 1945	28 February 1945	13 days
5	Hans von Obstfelder	General der Infanterie; Hans von Obstfelder (1886–1976)	1 March 1945	26 March 1945	25 days
6	Erich Brandenberger	General der Panzertruppe; Erich Brandenberger (1892–1955)	26 March 1945	6 May 1945	41 days

== See also ==
- 19th Army (German Empire) for the equivalent formation in World War I
