= 244th Infantry Division =

- 244. Infanterie-Division
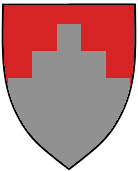
- Division insignia, 244th Infantry Division
- Active: 8 September 1943 – 7 October 1944
- Allegiance: Nazi Germany
- Branch: Heer (Wehrmacht)
- Type: Infantry
- Size: Division
- Garrison/HQ: Antwerp (1943); Marseille (1944)
- Engagements: Operation Dragoon: Battle of Marseille

The 244th Infantry Division (German: 244. Infanterie-Division) was an infantry division of the German army in World War II.

== History ==
=== Formation and early service ===
The 244th Infantry Division was founded on 8 September 1943 as a static division (German: bodenständige Division) in the Antwerp area under control of 15th Army and supervision by Wehrkreis I (East Prussia). Wehrkreis I had formed the Division E for recovering wounded soldiers on 19 June and used this Division E personnel for the formation of the 244th Infantry Division. Additionally, the division was joined by supply units of the former 39th Infantry Division, which had sustained heavy casualties in the southern sectors of the Eastern Front and was subsequently dissolved. The initial divisional commander was Martin Gilbert.

Initially, the division consisted of Grenadier Regiment 932, 933 and 934, as well as Artillery Regiment 244 and the Division Units 244. The three grenadier regiments contained three battalions each, and Artillery Regiment 244 consisted of three detachments. In late December 1943, the 244th Infantry Division was assigned to Group Knieß, which in July 1944 became the LXXXV (85th) Army Corps. Group Knieß was part of the 19th Army starting in January 1944.

On 19 April 1944, the Grenadier Regiments 932 and 934 each received an additional fourth battalion in the form of the former "eastern battalions" (German: Ost-Bataillone) 666 and 681. Starting in May 1944, the 244th Infantry Division was placed under the newly-formed Army Group G.

=== Between Overlord and Dragoon ===
Following the Allied invasion of northern France ("Operation Overlord") that started on 6 June 1944, seven German infantry divisions were left on garrison duty of the southern French coast in August 1944. These were, from west to east, the 716th, the 198th, the 189th, the 338th, the 244th, the 242nd and 148th Infantry Divisions. In the summer of 1944, the 244th Infantry Division was tasked with the defense of some 80 km of coastline and staffed with 11,640 personnel. On 15 August 1944, the Allied landings in southern France ("Operation Dragoon") began with frontal Allied amphibious attacks by the 3rd US Infantry Division, 45th US Infantry Division and 36th US Infantry Division against the positions of the German 242nd Infantry Division.

=== Operation Dragoon ===
As the Allied Operation Dragoon coincided with the Allied breakthroughs into the northern French countryside and the encirclement of German forces in the Falaise pocket in northern France, the disembarkment in southern France threatened to cut off all of Army Group G in southern France, including both the 1st Army and the 19th Army (and thus the 244th Infantry Division).

On 17 August at 09:40, orders came from Berlin to Army Group G to withdraw all forces except for those in fortresses or engaged in combat and to link up with Army Group B. One such fortress that was exempted from the withdrawal order was Marseille, thus exempting 244th Infantry Division from the withdrawal order. The LXXXV Corps was ordered by 17th Army commander Friedrich Wiese on 17 August to defend the Toulon–Marseille sector in the face of the rapid advances scored by the US VI Corps (Truscott). The Americans encircled the LXII Army Corps and captured its staff, leaving LXXXV Corps in charge of the remnants of LXII Corps' forces.

The division commander, Hans Schäfer, was ordered to defend Marseille without retreat, rendering the 244th Infantry Division as a sacrifice (along with the 242nd Division) to enable the withdrawal of Army Group G.

=== Battle of Marseille ===
The French 3rd Algerian Infantry Division sent parts of its forces towards the Battle of Toulon, but marched its Chapius group, including the 7th Algerian Rifle Regiment, towards the city of Marseille on 20 August instead. At this point, the garrison of the city numbered some 13,000 German defenders, including 2,500 Kriegsmarine and 3,900 Luftwaffe personnel, with 244th Infantry Division as the leading army contingent. Schäfer ordered much of the naval personnel transferred from the coastal fortresses into the second line of the land defenses and prepared for battle in the outer defensive belts. By 19 August, the German defenders had withdrawn from most of their positions outside of the city's perimeter.

Inspired by the major uprising by the French resistance in Paris on 19 August as well as the imminent arrival of French troops, maquis partisans massively ramped up their activity in the Marseille area, with Schäfer estimating enemy partisans to number as many as 80,000. Partisan activity was especially pronounced in the small towns outside of Marseille, where German attempts to set up forward defenses were regularly ambushed. The main French forces came into strike range on 21 August near Auriol, with the 7th Algerian Rifle Regiment, the 3rd Moroccan Tabors Group and the 1st Combat Command (Aimé Sudre) of the 1st French Armored Division.

The French thrust led through the positions of the various regiments of the 244th Infantry Division; Grenadier Regiment 934 battled the 3rd Moroccan Tabors at Cassis, whereas Grenadier Regiment 933 was positioned on the Aubagne crossroads before it was dislodged from there by the 1st Combat Command. Grenadier Regiment 932 guarded the northern outskirts of the city, where it was faced with various companies of the 7th Algerian Rifles.

The city of Marseille surrendered on 28 August. Schäfer was subsequently questioned by British interrogaters.

=== Formal dissolution ===
After the surrender of Marseille on 28 August 1944, the entirety of the 244th Division except for two battalions stopped existing. Only the battalions IV./932 and IV./934 (the two former eastern battalions added to the divisions on 19 April 1944), were at this point stationed, away from the main body of the division, with the IV Luftwaffe Field Corps and thus survived the destruction of the division. They subsequently joined the 19th Army in the Upper Rhine sector, and were eventually both used in the creation of the Russian Liberation Army. Starting in August 1944, the division was marked in German records as "status unknown" (German: „Verbleib unbekannt“) and was formally dissolved on 7 October 1944.

== Organization ==
Organizational chart of the 244th Infantry Division
Year	Month	Army Corps	Army	Army Group	Area of operations
1943	Oct.	Army group reserves		Army Group D	Antwerp (German-occupied Belgium)
1943	Nov./Dec.	Army reserves	15th Army	Army Group D	Antwerp (German-occupied Belgium)
1944	Jan.–Apr.	Group Knieß	19th Army	Army Group D	Marseille (German-occupied France)
1944	May–Jul.	Group Knieß	19th Army	Army Group G	Marseille (German-occupied France)
1944	Aug.	"Status unknown"			

== Noteworthy individuals ==
- Martin Gilbert, divisional commander of the 244th Infantry Division (1 September 1943 – 14 April 1944).
- Hans Schäfer, divisional commander of the 244th Infantry Division (14 April – late August 1944).
