= 244th Division =

244th Division may refer to:

- 244th Infantry Division, Wehrmacht, Germany
- 244th Rifle Division, Soviet Union

== See also ==
- List of military divisions by number
- 244th Regiment (disambiguation)
