= Georg von Sodenstern =

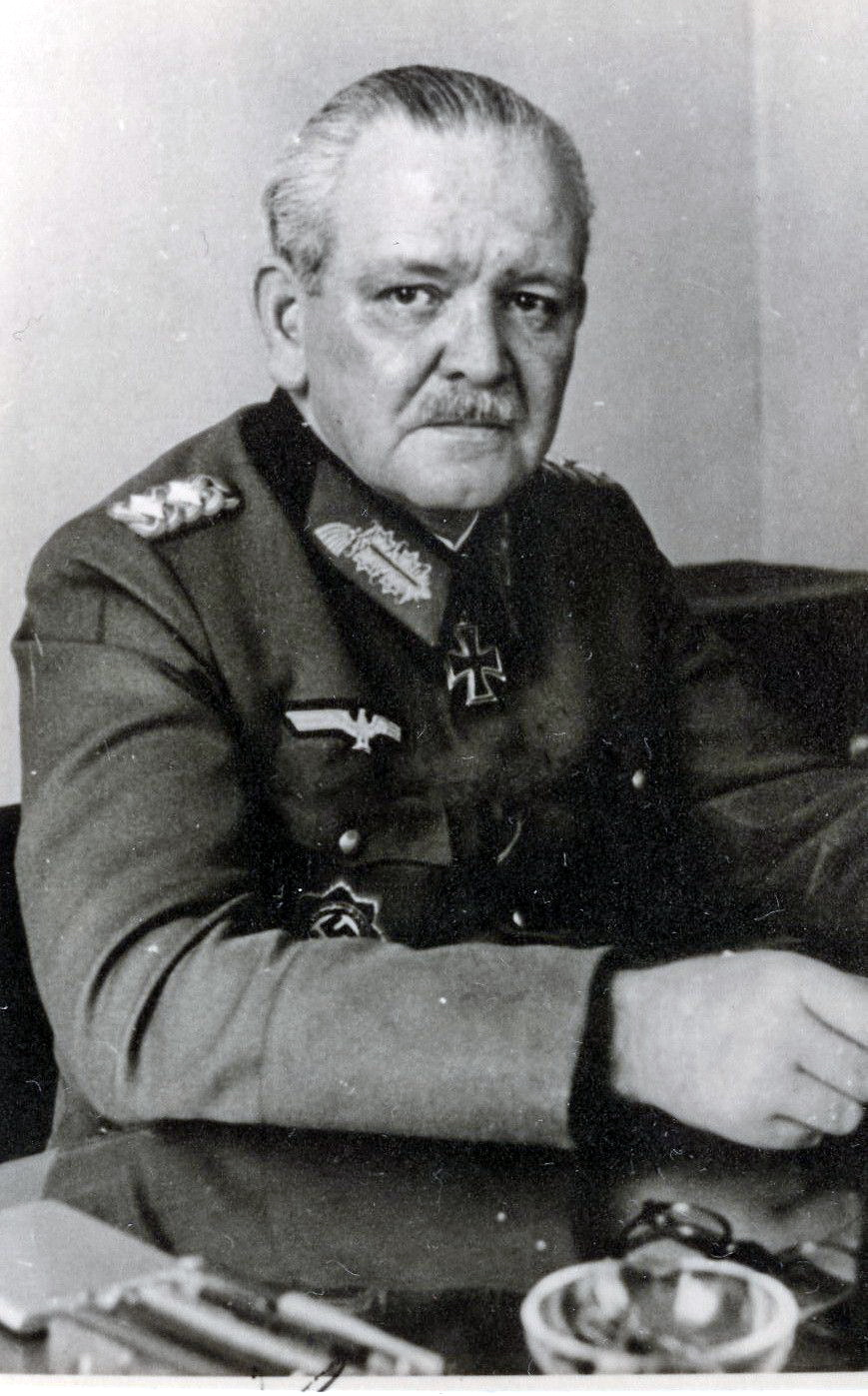
- Born: 15 November 1889; Kassel, German Empire
- Died: 20 July 1955 (aged 65); Frankfurt, West Germany
- Military career
- Allegiance: German Empire; Weimar Republic; Nazi Germany
- Branch: German Army
- Service years: 1909–1945
- Rank: General der Infanterie
- Commands: 19th Army
- Conflicts: World War I; World War II; Battle of France; Operation Barbarossa; Battle of Kiev (1941); Battle of the Caucasus; Battle of Stalingrad
- Awards: Knight's Cross of the Iron Cross

Georg von Sodenstern (15 November 1889 – 20 July 1955) was a German general in the Wehrmacht during World War II who commanded the 19th Army. He was also a recipient of the Knight's Cross of the Iron Cross of Nazi Germany.

It has been indicated von Sodenstern was part of a group, including Erwin von Witzleben, who proposed a coup against Adolf Hitler in 1937.

== Career ==
After his cadet training, Georg von Sodenstern joined the 3rd Upper Silesian Infantry Regiment No. 62 as an ensign on 13 March 1909. He was promoted to lieutenant on 27 January 1910. In 1914, he went into World War I with his regiment as a company officer. On 25 February 1915, he was promoted to Oberleutnant. He was promoted to captain on 18 August 1917.

After the First World War, he joined the Reichswehr and deployed in the 27th Infantry Regiment. He then became a company commander in the 6th Infantry Regiment. In 1924, he was transferred to Kassel as a staff officer for Group Command 2. In 1925, he joined the General Staff of Infantry Leader III in Potsdam. In 1926, he was transferred to the Army Organization Department in Berlin. The following year, he was assigned directly to the Troops Office and was promoted to major on 1 February 1928.

In 1931, he was then appointed adjutant to the chief of the troop office. He was promoted to lieutenant colonel on 1 October 1932 and colonel on 1 September 1934. On 15 October 1935, he took over as commander of the newly formed 65th Infantry Regiment in Delmenhorst . He resigned in August 1937 and became Chief of Staff of the VI Army Corps in Munster. After being promoted to major general on 1 March 1938, von Sodenstern became Chief of the General Staff at Group Command 2 on 1 December 1938. He then became Chief of Staff of Army Group C under Wilhelm Ritter von Leeb, which was responsible for defending the western border during the invasion of Poland .

On 1 February 1940 he was promoted to Generalleutnant. On 6 February 1940, he became Chief of Staff of Army Group A under Gerd von Rundstedt, with which he took part in the western campaign . On 1 August 1940 he was promoted to General der Infanterie. Due to Rundstedt's appointment as Commander-in-Chief West in October 1940, he remained active in the West until early 1941. At the beginning of the attack on the Soviet Union on 22 June 1941, he became Chief of the General Staff of Army Group South and served under von Rundstedt, Walter von Reichenau, and Fedor von Bock. When the Army Group was divided up for the forthcoming summer offensive in early July 1942, he was appointed Chief of Staff of Army Group B under Maximilian von Weichs.

In July 1943, he was transferred to the Führerreserve. On 13 August 1943, he was reactivated and in the west became supreme commander of Army Group Felber, from which he raised the 19th Army. In this function he was responsible, among other things, for the German measures in the Italian occupation area in southern France when Italy left the war. At the end of June 1944, von Sodenstern was replaced by Friedrich Wiese and left the Wehrmacht with honor.

== Post military ==
From 1946, he worked on studies on the Second World War as part of the German department of the United States Army's war history research group. From 1954, Sodenstern presided over a “working group for defense research” as a figurehead, with Jürgen Rohwer actually doing the work. Sodenstern died on 20 July 1955 in Frankfurt am Main.

== Awards and decorations ==
- Iron Cross (both classes)
- Cross for Merit in War
- Austrian Military Merit Cross
- Knight's Cross of the Iron Cross on 19 July 1940 as Generalleutnant and Chef des Generalstabes Heeresgruppe A
- German Cross in Gold on 2 January 1943

Military offices
Preceded by none	Commander of 19. Armee; 26 August 1943 – 29 June 1944	Succeeded by General der Infanterie Friedrich Wiese
