= LXII Army Corps =

German Wehrmacht

- LXII. Armeekorps
- Active: 15 September 1942 – 18 August 1944
- Country: Nazi Germany
- Branch: Army
- Type: Corps
- Engagements: World War II

Commanders
- Notable commanders: Ferdinand Neuling

The LXII Army Corps (German: LXII. Armeekorps), initially known as the LXII Reserve Corps (German: LXII. Reservekorps), was an army corps of the German Wehrmacht during World War II. The formation was active between 1942 and 1944.

== History ==
The LXII Reserve Corps was formed on 15 September 1942 in Wehrkreis III (Berlin) for the purpose of leadership and organization of reserve divisions in Ukraine. It was a subordinate of the Wehrmachtbefehlshaber Ukraine staff between October 1942 and December 1943. The commander of the corps throughout its lifetime was Ferdinand Neuling, the former commander of the 239th Infantry Division.

Between 1 June 1943 and 3 December 1943, it consisted of the 143rd Reserve Division and the 147th Reserve Division.

The corps was redeployed on 15 January 1944 to Le Bourg-d'Oisans and renamed LXII. Armeekorps on 5 August 1944. The corps was destroyed on 18 August 1944 in Marseille and formally disbanded on 2 November 1944.

== Structure ==
Structure of the LXII (62nd) Reserve Corps and LXII (62nd) Army Corps of the German Wehrmacht between 1942 and 1944
Name	Year	Date	Commander	Subordinate Divisions	Superior Formation	Operational area
LXII. Reservekorps	1942	October	Ferdinand Neuling	Unknown	Wehrmachtbefehlshaber Ukraine	Dubno
LXII. Reservekorps	1942	November	Ferdinand Neuling	Unknown	Wehrmachtbefehlshaber Ukraine	Dubno
LXII. Reservekorps	1942	December	Ferdinand Neuling	Unknown	Wehrmachtbefehlshaber Ukraine	Dubno
LXII. Reservekorps	1943	January	Ferdinand Neuling	Unknown	Wehrmachtbefehlshaber Ukraine	Dubno
LXII. Reservekorps	1943	February	Ferdinand Neuling	Unknown	Wehrmachtbefehlshaber Ukraine	Dubno
LXII. Reservekorps	1943	March	Ferdinand Neuling	Unknown	Wehrmachtbefehlshaber Ukraine	Dubno
LXII. Reservekorps	1943	April	Ferdinand Neuling	Unknown	Wehrmachtbefehlshaber Ukraine	Dubno
LXII. Reservekorps	1943	May	Ferdinand Neuling	Unknown	Wehrmachtbefehlshaber Ukraine	Dubno
LXII. Reservekorps	1943	1 June	Ferdinand Neuling	143rd Reserve, 147th Reserve	Wehrmachtbefehlshaber Ukraine	Dubno
LXII. Reservekorps	1943	7 July	Ferdinand Neuling	143rd Reserve, 147th Reserve	Wehrmachtbefehlshaber Ukraine	Dubno
LXII. Reservekorps	1943	5 August	Ferdinand Neuling	143rd Reserve, 147th Reserve	Wehrmachtbefehlshaber Ukraine	Dubno
LXII. Reservekorps	1943	5 September	Ferdinand Neuling	143rd Reserve, 147th Reserve	Wehrmachtbefehlshaber Ukraine	Dubno
LXII. Reservekorps	1943	4 October	Ferdinand Neuling	143rd Reserve, 147th Reserve	Wehrmachtbefehlshaber Ukraine	Dubno
LXII. Reservekorps	1943	8 November	Ferdinand Neuling	143rd Reserve, 147th Reserve	Wehrmachtbefehlshaber Ukraine	Dubno
LXII. Reservekorps	1943	3 December	Ferdinand Neuling	143rd Reserve, 147th Reserve	Wehrmachtbefehlshaber Ukraine	Dubno
LXII. Reservekorps	1944	January	Ferdinand Neuling	Unknown	Army Group D reserves	
LXII. Reservekorps	1944	February	Ferdinand Neuling	Unknown	Army Group D reserves	
LXII. Reservekorps	1944	March	Ferdinand Neuling	Unknown	Army Group D reserves	
LXII. Reservekorps	1944	8 April	Ferdinand Neuling	148th Reserve, 242nd Infantry	19th Army	Le Bourg-d'Oisans
LXII. Reservekorps	1944	17 May	Ferdinand Neuling	148th Reserve, 242nd Infantry	19th Army	Marseille
LXII. Reservekorps	1944	12 June	Ferdinand Neuling	148th Reserve, 242nd Infantry	19th Army	Marseille
LXII. Reservekorps	1944	17 July	Ferdinand Neuling	148th Reserve, 242nd Infantry	19th Army	Marseille
LXII. Armeekorps	1944	August	Formation destroyed on 18 August 1944.			
LXII. Armeekorps	1944	November	Formation not formally dissolved until 2 November 1944.			

== Noteworthy individuals ==
- Ferdinand Neuling, commander of the LXII Reserve Corps and LXII Army Corps throughout its active time.
