= Altair Franco Ferreira =

Brazilian military officer

- Born: April 22, 1902; Rio de Janeiro
- Died: June 1980 (aged 78) Rio de Janeiro
- Allegiance: Brazil
- Branch: Brazilian Army: FEB
- Service years: 1920–1967
- Rank: Major (during World War II); Marshal
- Conflicts: Tenente Revolts; World War II; Italian campaign

Altair Franco Ferreira (Rio de Janeiro, April 22, 1902 – Rio de Janeiro, June 1980) was a FEB Major during the Italian Campaign in World War II and who later became a Marshal of the Brazilian Army, known for being one of the commanders who led the latest battles on Italian soil, his most famous mission was the surrender and capture of the 148th Infantry Division, which marked the end of Italian fascist forces.

== Biography ==
=== Personal life ===
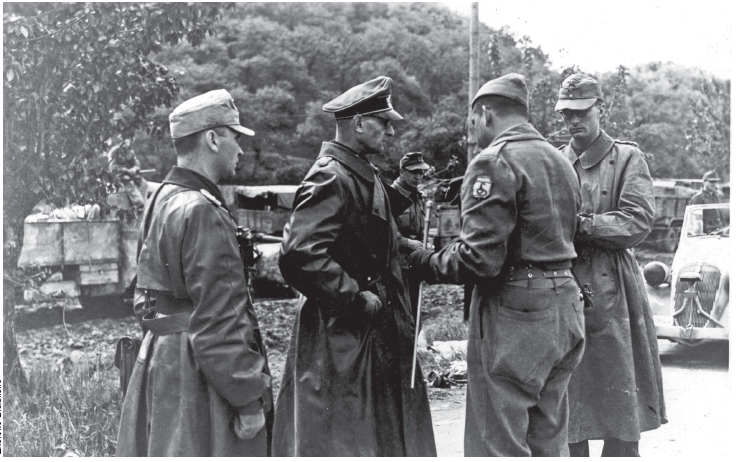
Colonel von Kleiber, on behalf of General Otto Fretter-Pico, in preliminary conversations with Major Franco Ferreira, (with his back, second from right to left) about the surrender of the 148th Infantry Division to the FEB, after the Battle of Collecchio, on April 29, 1945.

Born in Rio de Janeiro in 1902, Ferreira already knew how to speak German as a child because of his father, who in 1910 specialized in the German Army, Altair studied in primary school and learned the language, always being a very studious student. When his family returned to Brazil in 1920, Ferreira entered the Military School of Realengo where he was expelled in 1922 for supporting the Tenentist Movement.

It was then that Altair competed for Banco do Brasil and was transferred to Porto Alegre, where he met and married Alba Glória de Barbedo Franco Ferreira, sister of Alceu Barbedo, who was Attorney General of the Republic of Getúlio Vargas in the Estado Novo.

=== Back to military life and World War II ===
With the rise of Getúlio Vargas in power in 1930, Altaïr was amnestied with his entire class, which allowed him to return to the army; then Franco Ferreira did it and returned to the army, with the arrival of the Second World War and the declaration of war of Brazil to the Axis forces in 1942, it was a matter of time for Brazil to enter the war, the FEB was created in 1943 and after the necessary training the Brazilian soldiers were sent to Italy in 1944, and Altaïr had already reached Major's military rank.

Altaïr served in the headquarters of General Olympio Falconiére, commander of non-organic divisional bodies. For this reason, when Falconiére received the surrender of Otto Fretter-Picco, of the 148th German Infantry Division, Major Altair was together mediating the conversations because he knew the German language very well.

=== After the war ===
Altair, in 1964, was already serving in Recife as General and had the mission to arrest Governor Arraes, of whom he was a great admirer and refused orders to handcuff him. President Castelo Branco called him to Brasilia to communicate that he could not promote him because he needed political generals and he was a classic "legalist". As the war had gone, he retired as a Marshal.

Soon after retiring as a Marshal, Ferreira Franco discovered that he had cancer and soon left the army, spent his last years with great difficulty because of the disease but always continued to dedicate himself to his family.

=== Death ===
Altair died of cancer in June, 1980 at the age of 78.
