= Great Synagogue (Katowice) =

Destroyed synagogue in Katowice, Poland

- Polish: Synagoga Wielka w Katowicach; German: Große Synagoge in Kattowitz
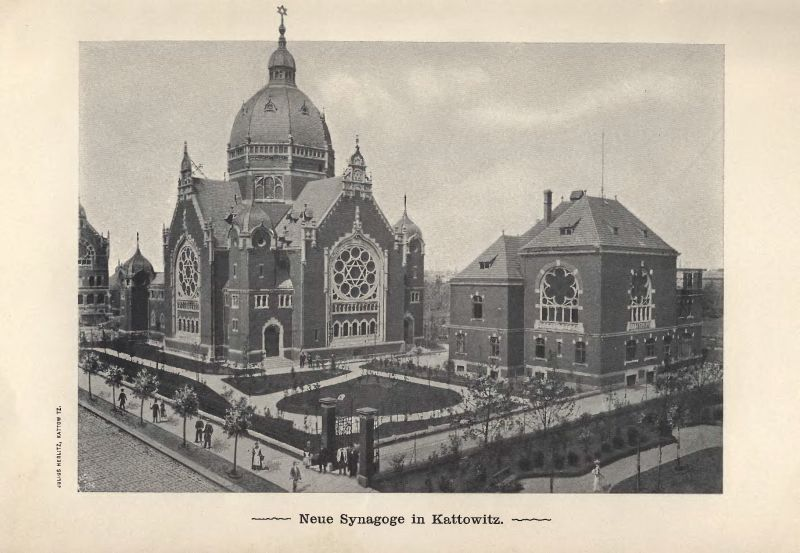
- A postcard of the former synagogue, undated

- Location of the destroyed synagogue in Poland

Religion
- Affiliation: Judaism (former)
- Ecclesiastical or organizational status: Synagogue (1900–1939)
- Status: Destroyed

Location
- Location: Uferstrasse (until 1922)/Mickiewicza (since 1922) Street, Katowice
- Country: Poland
- Interactive map of Great Synagogue
- Coordinates: 50°15′40″N 19°01′08″E

Architecture
- Architect: Max Grünfeld
- Type: Synagogue architecture
- Style: Gothic Revival; Renaissance Revival
- Established: 1866 (as a congregation)
- Groundbreaking: 1896
- Completed: 1900
- Destroyed: September 1939

Specifications
- Capacity: 1,120 seats
- Dome: One
- Materials: Brick

The Great Synagogue (Polish: Synagoga Wielka w Katowicach; German: Große Synagoge in Kattowitz) was a former Jewish congregation and synagogue, located in Katowice, Poland.

Designed by Max Grünfeld in an eclectic mix of the Gothic Revival and Renaissance Revival styles, and completed in 1900, the synagogue served as a house of prayer until World War II when it was destroyed by Nazis by arson in early September 1939, during the invasion of Poland.

== History ==
The plans to raise a new synagogue in Katowice arose around 1890, when the Old Synagogue became too small for the local worshippers. The construction begun in 1896, and the architect in charge was Max Grünfeld, a son of Ignatz Grünfeld who designed the old synagogue. The construction was finished in 1900 and the synagogue was opened on 12 October 1900; the largest synagogue in the city.

The synagogue was set on fire by Nazis in early days of September 1939 after they gained control of the city during the invasion of Poland at the start of World War II; probably on 8 September. (Note: Also believed to be 4 September.) After the war, the few Jews who survived the Holocaust were unable to gather enough resources and support to rebuild the synagogue.

The Synagogue Square, along with a small market, occupies the site of the former synagogue. In 1988, a monument was raised in the square, dedicated to the Jewish inhabitants of the city who perished during World War II. There were a series of plans to rebuild the synagogue, though none of them have proceeded to the implementation stage.

== Design ==
The brick synagogue was designed on the basis of a modified rectangle in style mixing Gothic Revival with Renaissance Revival, eclecticism, and traces of Moorish Revival styles; similar to the style of Reform synagogues in contemporary Germany.

The synagogue had a large dome with a cross-ribbed vault over the main prayer chamber which was preceded by a large entrance hall with offices and the chamber of marriage. The main chamber was topped with a lantern. Other characteristics elements included large decorated windows and small towers.

The main chamber could hold 1,120 people; 670 men and 450 women.

== Gallery ==
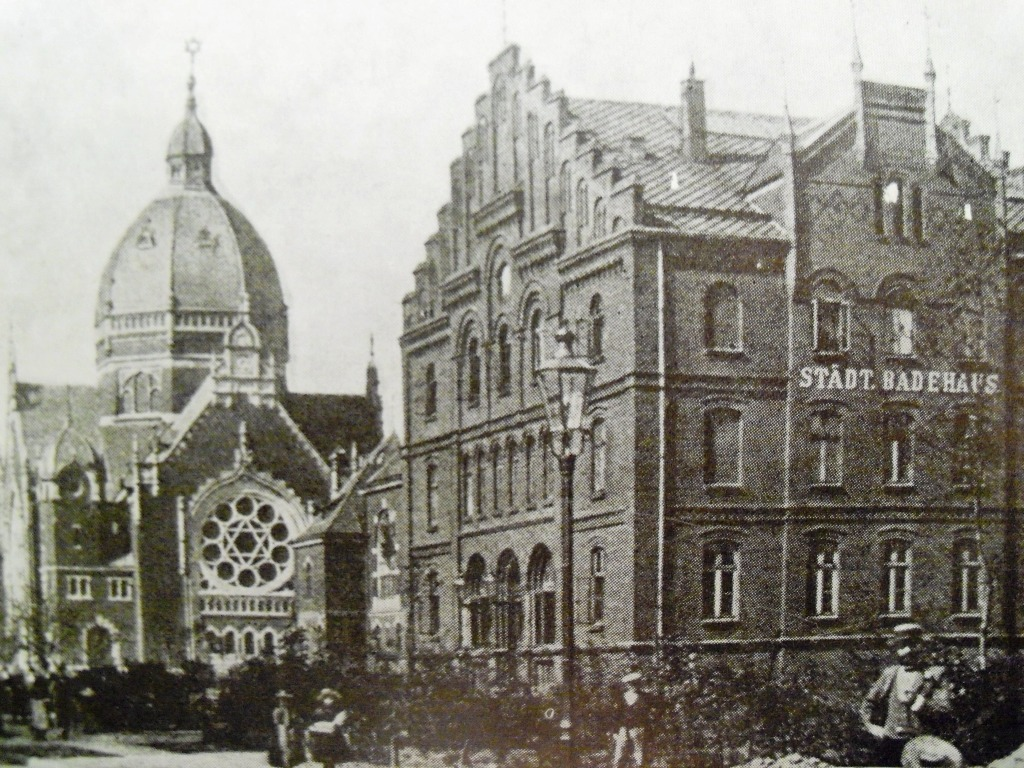
The former synagogue and the city bath, early 20th century

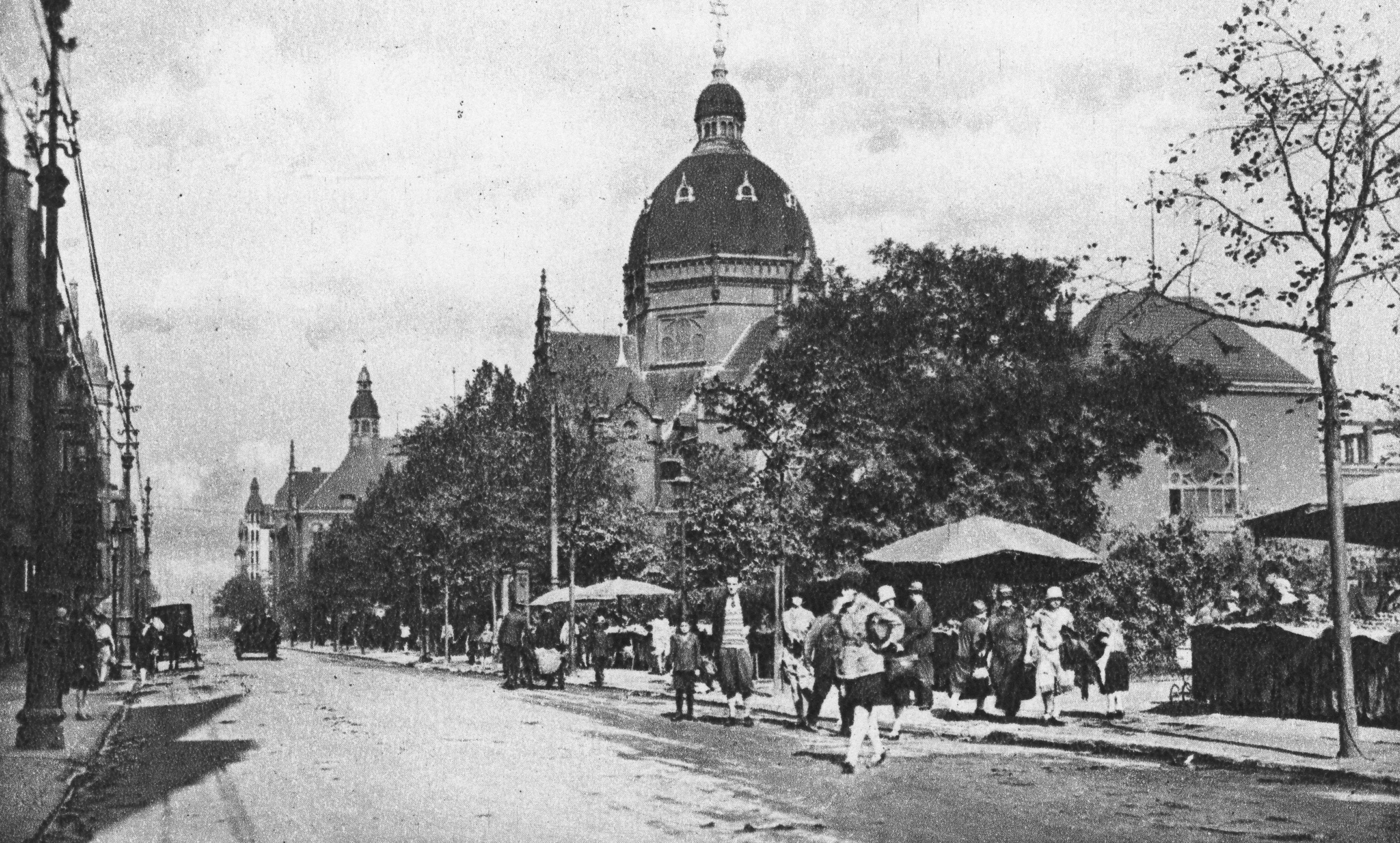
Great Synagogue and Mickiewicza Street in the interwar period

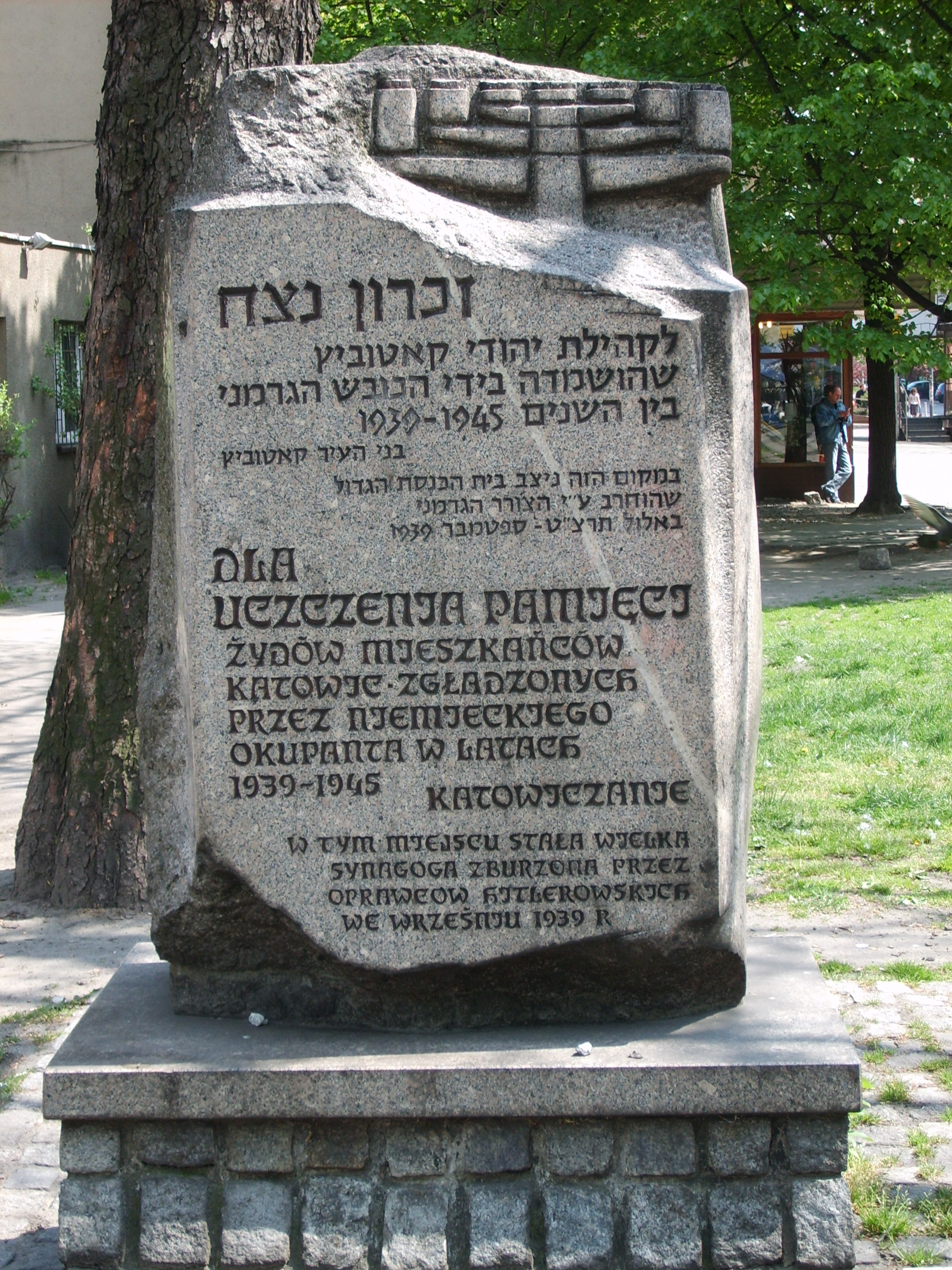
Memorial to Holocaust victims from Katowice

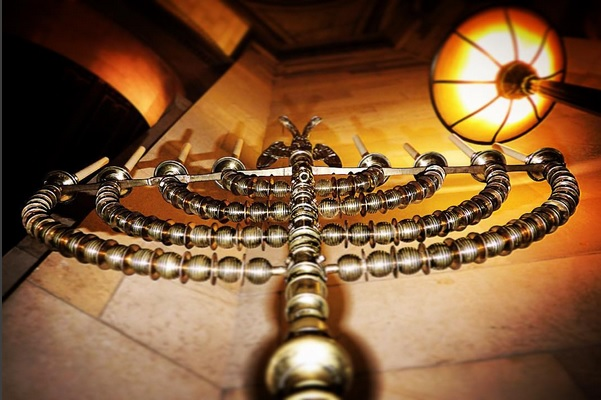
19th-century Hanukkah menorah from the Great Synagogue on display in the Los Angeles City Hall

== See also ==
- History of the Jews in Poland
- List of active synagogues in Poland
