= Friedrich Wiese =

German general (1892–1975)

- Born: 5 December 1892; Nordhastedt, Province of Schleswig-Holstein, Kingdom of Prussia, German Empire
- Died: 13 February 1975 (aged 82); Giessen, Hessen, West Germany
- Military career
- Allegiance: German Empire; Weimar Republic; Nazi Germany
- Branch: Imperial German Army; Freikorps; Police (Polizei); German Army
- Service years: 1914–1918; 1918–1919; 1919–1935; 1935–1945
- Rank: General der Infanterie
- Commands: 26th Infantry Division; XXXV Army Corps; VIII Army Corps; 19th Army; XI Army Corps
- Conflicts: World War I; World War II; Battle of France; Operation Barbarossa; Battle of Białystok–Minsk; Battle of Smolensk (1941); Battle of Moscow; Battle of Kursk; Battle of Smolensk (1943); Operation Dragoon; Prague Offensive
- Awards: Knight's Cross of the Iron Cross with Oak Leaves

Heinrich Friedrich Wiese (5 December 1892 – 13 February 1975) was a German general in the Wehrmacht who commanded the 19th Army. He was a recipient of the Knight's Cross of the Iron Cross with Oak Leaves of Nazi Germany.

== Awards and decorations ==
- Iron Cross (1914), 2nd and 1st Class
  - 2nd Class (15 February 1916)
  - 1st Class (29 September 1918)
- Wound Badge (1918) in Black
- The Honour Cross of the World War 1914/1918 with Swords on 22 December 1934
- Wehrmacht Long Service Award, 4th to 1st Class
- Sudetenland Medal
- Clasp to the Iron Cross (1939), 2nd and 1st Class
  - 2nd Class (3 June 1940)
  - 1st Class (16 June 1940)
- German Cross in Gold (18 February 1942)
- Eastern Front Medal in August 1942
- Knight's Cross of the Iron Cross with Oak Leaves
  - Knight's Cross on 14 February 1942 as Oberst and commander of the Infanterie-Regiment 39
  - 372nd Oak Leaves on 24 January 1944 as General der Infanterie and commanding general of the XXXV. Armeekorps

== Bibliography ==
- Fellgiebel, Walther-Peer (2000) [First published 1986]. Die Träger des Ritterkreuzes des Eisernen Kreuzes 1939–1945 — Die Inhaber der höchsten Auszeichnung des Zweiten Weltkrieges aller Wehrmachtteile [The Bearers of the Knight's Cross of the Iron Cross 1939–1945 — The Owners of the Highest Award of the Second World War of all Wehrmacht Branches] (in German). Friedberg, Germany: Podzun-Pallas. ISBN 978-3-7909-0284-6.
- Patzwall, Klaus D.; Scherzer, Veit (2001). Das Deutsche Kreuz 1941 – 1945 Geschichte und Inhaber Band II [The German Cross 1941 – 1945 History and Recipients Volume 2] (in German). Norderstedt, Germany: Verlag Klaus D. Patzwall. ISBN 978-3-931533-45-8.
- Thomas, Franz (1998). Die Eichenlaubträger 1939–1945 Band 2: L–Z [The Oak Leaves Bearers 1939–1945 Volume 2: L–Z] (in German). Osnabrück, Germany: Biblio-Verlag. ISBN 978-3-7648-2300-9.

Military offices
| Preceded by Generaloberst Walter Weiß | Commander of 26. Infanterie-Division; 15 April 1942 – 5 August 1943 | Succeeded by Generalleutnant Johannes de Boer |
| Preceded by Generaloberst Lothar Rendulic | Commander of XXXV. Armeekorps; August 1943 – January 1944 | Succeeded by General der Infanterie Horst Großmann |
| Preceded by General der Infanterie Horst Großmann | Commander of XXXV. Armeekorps; February 1944 – June 1944 | Succeeded by Generalleutnant Kurt-Jürgen Freiherr von Lützow |
| Preceded by General der Infanterie Georg von Sodenstern | Commander of 19. Armee; June 1944 – December 1944 | Succeeded by General der Infanterie Siegfried Rasp |
| Preceded by General der Infanterie Rudolf von Bünau | Commander of XI. Armeekorps; 6 April 1945 – 8 May 1945 | Succeeded by None |
