= Battle of Mikołów =

1939 Invasion of Poland battle in WWII

Coordinates: 50°10′32″N 18°54′17″E

- Part of Invasion of Poland
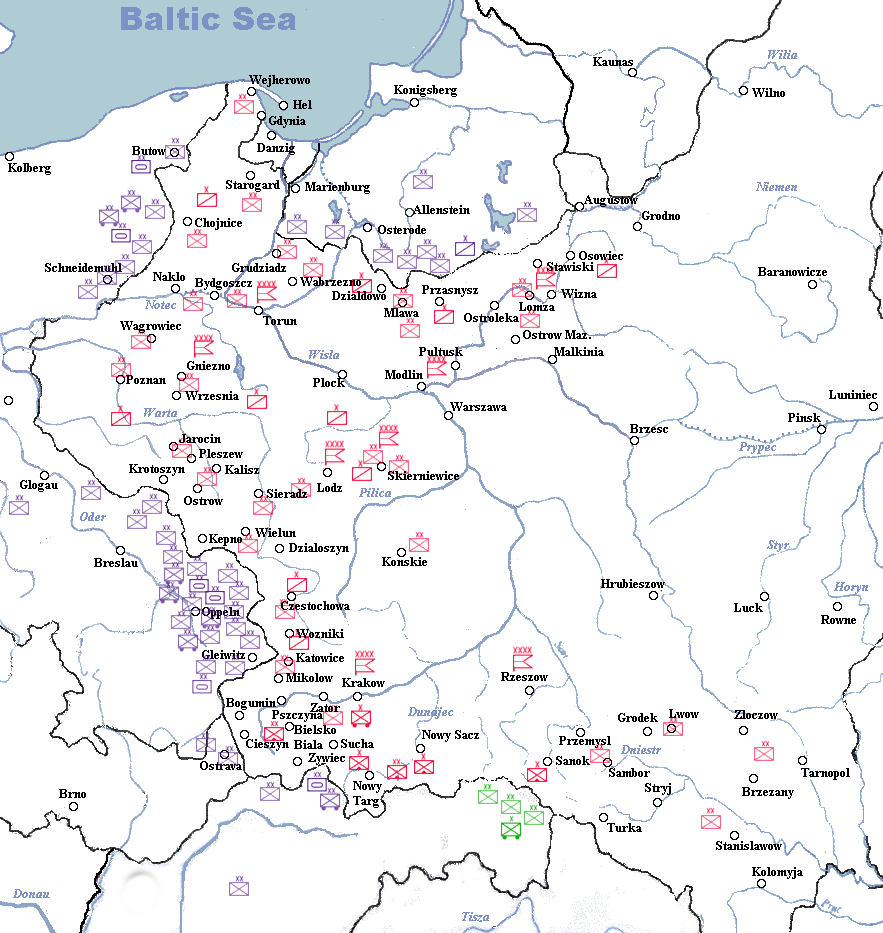
- Battle of Mikołów
Date	September 1–2, 1939
Location	Mikołów, Pszczyna, Silesian Voivodeship, Poland
Result	German victory

Belligerents
Germany	Poland

Commanders and leaders
(Nazi Germany) Erwin Koch (Nazi Germany) Hans von Obstfelder	(Second Polish Republic) Jan Jagmin-Sadowski

Strength
2 Infantry Divisions and 5th Armored Division	1 Infantry Division

Casualties and losses
Unknown	Unknown

The Battle of Mikołów (Polish: Bitwa pod Mikolowem, Bitwa wyrska) refers to the border engagement on September 1 and 2, 1939, that took place in the area of the town of Mikołów, located in the Silesian Voivodeship, during the early stages of the Invasion of Poland in the Second World War.

== Introduction ==
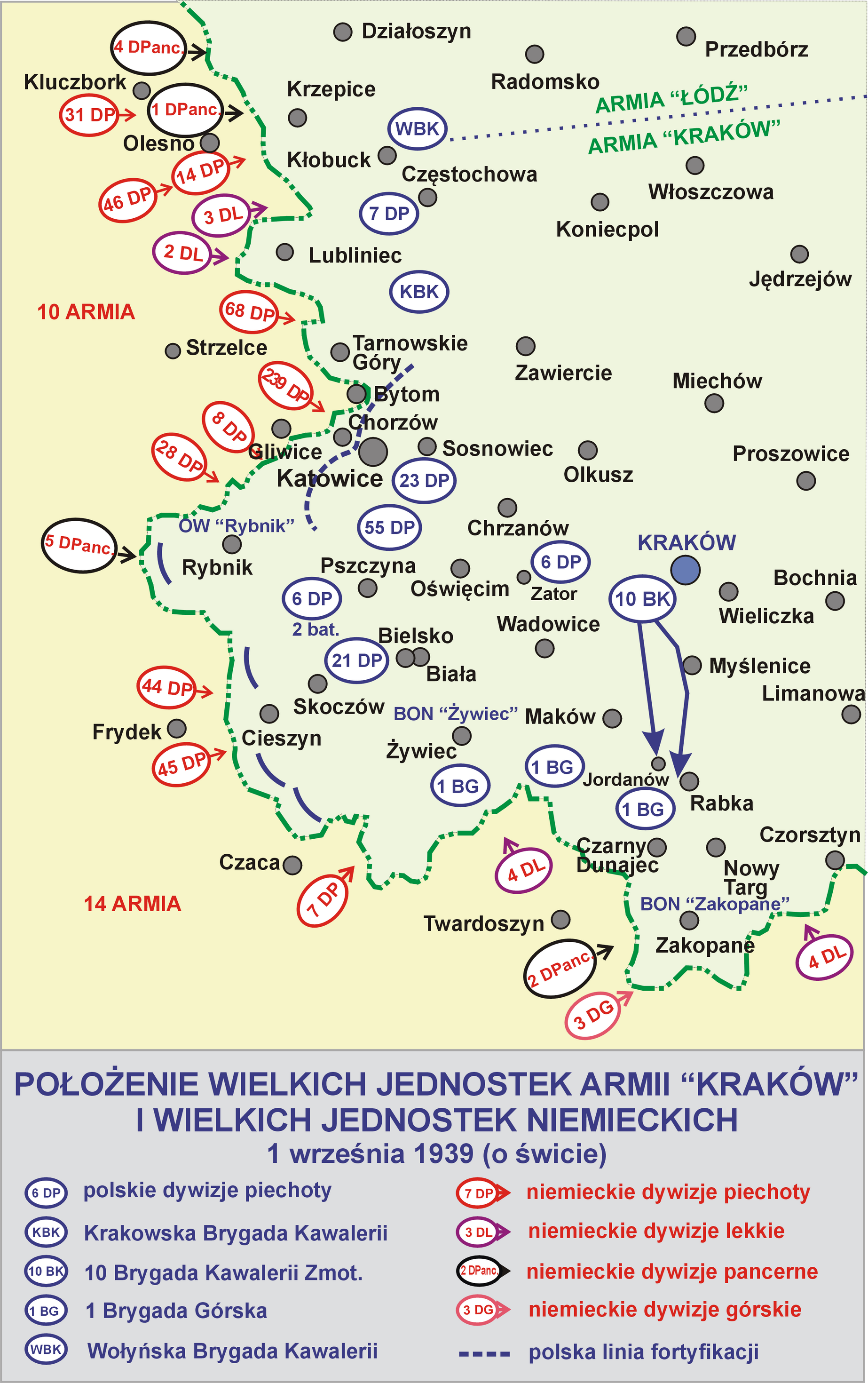
Positions of Polish and German forces before the battle. Map by Lonio17

The battle began with attacks by aircraft of the German 4th Air Fleet (Luftflotte), which bombed several areas, including the airfield in Katowice. Soon afterwards, early in the morning on September 1, 1939, units of the Wehrmacht crossed the Polish-German border. The invaders were helped by members of the German minority in Poland, whose paramilitary organization, the Freikorps, attacked Polish units from the rear. Several skirmishes took place, most of them in the densely populated industrial areas of the cities of Ruda Śląska, Chorzów and Katowice.

However, the main German attack was concentrated in the south of the industrial region, around the border towns of Mikołów and Pszczyna. There, units of the Polish Operational Group Silesia (part of the Kraków Army), faced the German 8th Infantry Division (General Erwin Koch), the 28th Infantry Division (Gen. Hans von Obstfelder) and the 5th Armored Division. These formations were all part of the VIII Corps.

== September 1, 1939 ==
The German 5th Armored Division, attacking towards Rybnik and Żory, managed to annihilate the Polish defenders in the morning. The units destroyed by the attackers were located in the Pszczyna Forest, their task was to provide a connection between Operational Groups 'Silesia' and 'Bielsko'. Their loss created a gap in the Polish defense, and the Germans took advantage of it on the following day. Despite desperate fighting, the Polish 55th Infantry Division (under General Jan Jagmin-Sadowski), were unable to halt the invaders.

== September 2, 1939 ==
The Germans preceded their main attack with an artillery bombardment from 5 a.m. Later on that day, two German battalions (49th and 83rd) moved towards Tychy, they were faced by Polish units, in the area of the village of Zwakow.

The battle that followed was one of the most ferocious of all those that took place in September 1939 in Upper Silesia. Polish units managed to halt the Germans, preventing them from capturing the town of Wyry. Nevertheless, in the afternoon of September 2, even though the frontline was stabilized, the headquarters of the Armia Kraków ordered all units to leave Upper Silesia and withdraw towards Kraków and the Vistula river. This decision was undertaken because the Germans, attacking in the area of Woźniki, broke the defenses of the Kraków Cavalry Brigade. Also in the south the Germans broke the Polish positions, and the Polish 6th Infantry Division hastily retreated towards Oświęcim. Thus, units in the area of Pszczyna and Mikołów were threatened with encirclement.

== Withdrawal ==
A withdrawal order reached all Polish units by 9 p.m. on September 2. Most soldiers did not believe it, however they obeyed and the whole operation was carried out good in order. Polish troops left Upper Silesia by September 3, heading towards Kraków. Most of these units found themselves in the area of Lublin, where they took part in the Battle of Tomaszów Lubelski.

Among Polish units that distinguished themselves in the Battle of Mikołów, there was the 73rd Infantry Regiment from Katowice. Consisting of soldiers from Silesia, it was regarded as one of the best organized and toughest of the whole Polish Army.

== See also ==
- List of World War II military equipment of Poland
- List of German military equipment of World War II

== Sources ==
- https://web.archive.org/web/20071026005726/http://www.wpk.p.lodz.pl/~bolas/main/bitwy/slask/slask.htm
- http://www.goslask.profort.org.pl/?a=historia
