= 148th Reserve Division =

148th Reserve Division 148th Infantry Division
- 148. Reserve-Division; 148. Infanterie-Division
- Active: 18 September 1944 - 28 April 1945
- Country: Nazi Germany
- Branch: Army
- Type: Infantry
- Size: Division
- Engagements: Operation Dragoon; Gothic Line; Spring 1945 offensive in Italy; Battle of Collecchio

Commanders
- Notable commanders: Otto Fretter-Pico

Insignia
- Reserve insignia

- Infantry insignia

- Infantry insignia

- Infantry insignia

The German 148th Reserve Division (German: 148. Reserve-Division) was a German reserve infantry formation during the Second World War. It was made up of three infantry regiments (the 281st, 285th, and 286th) and an artillery regiment. Initially an occupation force in southern France, serving as a depot for rest and refitting, it was activated as an infantry division and fought in Italy from 1944 to 1945. Redesignated the 148th Infantry Division (German: 148. Infanterie-Division) in September 1944 to fight the allied invasion during Operation Dragoon, it later fought in the Po River battles, surrendering to the Brazilian Expeditionary Force on April 28, 1945, after being encircled in the Battle of Collecchio, near the city of Fornovo di Taro at Galano.

== History ==
During Operation Dragoon, the 148th was ordered to counterattack against the beaches at Le Muy, where the US 45th Infantry Division had landed. The German plan was to throw the Allies in the Le Muy – Saint-Raphaël region back into the sea unilaterally. With almost no mobile reserves to react against the beach landings, the commander of the 189th Infantry Division, Richard von Schwerin, was ordered to establish an ad hoc battle group (Kampfgruppe) from all nearby units to counterattack the Allied bridgeheads in this area. While Schwerin assembled all the men he could find, the 148th Infantry Division near Draguignan encountered heavy resistance from the FFI, which had been reinforced by British paratroopers, upsetting the plan for a swift counterattack toward the beaches. After heavy fighting throughout the day, Schwerin ordered his troops to retreat under cover of night. At the same time, heavy fighting occurred at Saint-Raphaël. Mobile units of the 148th Infantry Division finally had arrived there and encountered the US 3rd Infantry Division, which was trying to take Saint-Raphaël. This attack, however, was fruitless. By 17 August, the German counter-attacks had been largely defeated, Saint-Raphaël was secured together with a large bridgehead along the coastline, and mobile forces had linked up with the airborne troops in Le Muy. French troops had been pouring ashore since 16 August, passing to the left of the American troops with the objective of Toulon and Marseille.

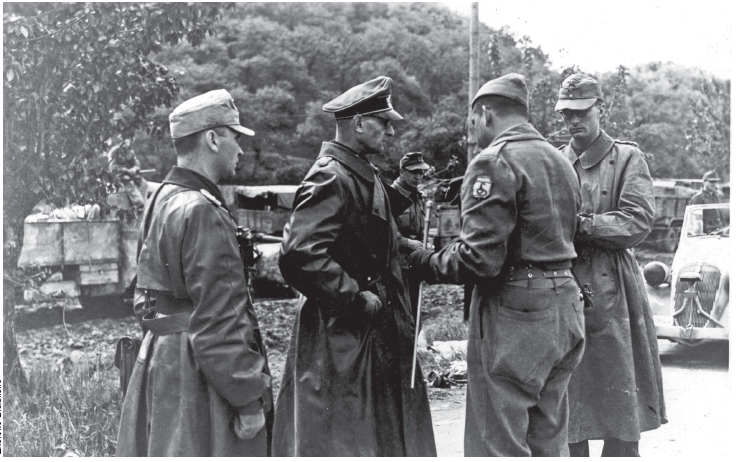
German Colonel von Kleiber in preliminary talks with Brazilian Major Franco Ferreira about the surrender of the 148th Infantry Division to the FEB, after the Battle of Collecchio, on April 29, 1945.

By the night of 16/17 August, Army Group G headquarters realized that it could not drive the Allies back into the sea. Simultaneously in northern France, the encirclement of the Falaise pocket threatened the loss of large numbers of German forces. Given the precarious situation, Adolf Hitler moved away from his "no step backwards" agenda and agreed to an OKW plan for the complete withdrawal of Army Groups G and B. The OKW plan was for all German forces (except the stationary fortress troops) in southern France to move north to link up with Army Group B to form a new defensive line from Sens through Dijon to the Swiss frontier. Two German divisions (the 148th and 157th) were to retreat into the French-Italian Alps. The Allies were privy to the German plan through Ultra interception.

The Germans started the withdrawal, while the motorized Allied forces broke out from their bridgeheads and pursued the German units from behind. The rapid Allied advance posed a major threat for the Germans, who could not retreat fast enough. The Germans tried to establish a defense line at the Rhône to shield the withdrawal of several valuable units there. The US 45th and 3rd Divisions were pressing to the north-west with uncontested speed, undermining Wiese's plan for a new defense line. Barjols and Brignoles were taken by the two American divisions on 19 August, which also were about to envelop Toulon, as well as Marseille from the north, cutting off the German units there.

On 18 August Neuling's surrounded LXII Corps headquarters attempted an unsuccessful breakout and was finally captured with the rest of the city after some fighting. The German troops in this area were exhausted and demoralized from the fighting against the FFI, so Taskforce Butler was also able to advance at high speed. Digne was liberated on 18 August. At Grenoble, the 157th Reserve Infantry Division faced the Allied advance, and its commander decided to retreat on 21 August toward the Alps. This decision would prove to be fatal for the Germans, as it left a large gap in the eastern flank of the retreating Army Group G. Blaskowitz now decided to sacrifice the 242nd Infantry Division in Toulon, as well as the 244th Infantry Division in Marseille, to buy time for the rest of Army Group G to retreat through the Rhône Valley, while the 11th Panzer Division and the 198th Infantry Division would shield the retreat in several defense lines.

In Italy, the 148th Infantry Division would first be used in anti-partisan warfare.

On April 28, the 148th Infantry Division's forces were concentrated near the Po river. Trying to stop the Germans crossing, Lieutenant Pitaluga's squadron, equipped with M8 Greyhound armored reconnaissance cars, opened fire against German troops who almost immediately blew the bridge behind them. Supported by a few Shermans of the 760th American tank battalion, Brazilian 3rd artillery howitzer groups with 105 mm and 155 mm guns, of the Brazilian 1st Company of the 6th Infantry Regiment (this regiment was commanded by Colonel Nelson de Mello), attacked under heavy German artillery and machinegun fire and set up a defensive line four miles from Fornovo, on the line Gaiano–Segalora–Talignano. Near 9 PM a furious German attack was launched against Segalora, trying to break the siege to get to the city of Parma, where other German forces were concentrating, having been repelled by 3rd company, also of the 6th Infantry Regiment. On April 29, the Germans made another try to break the siege.

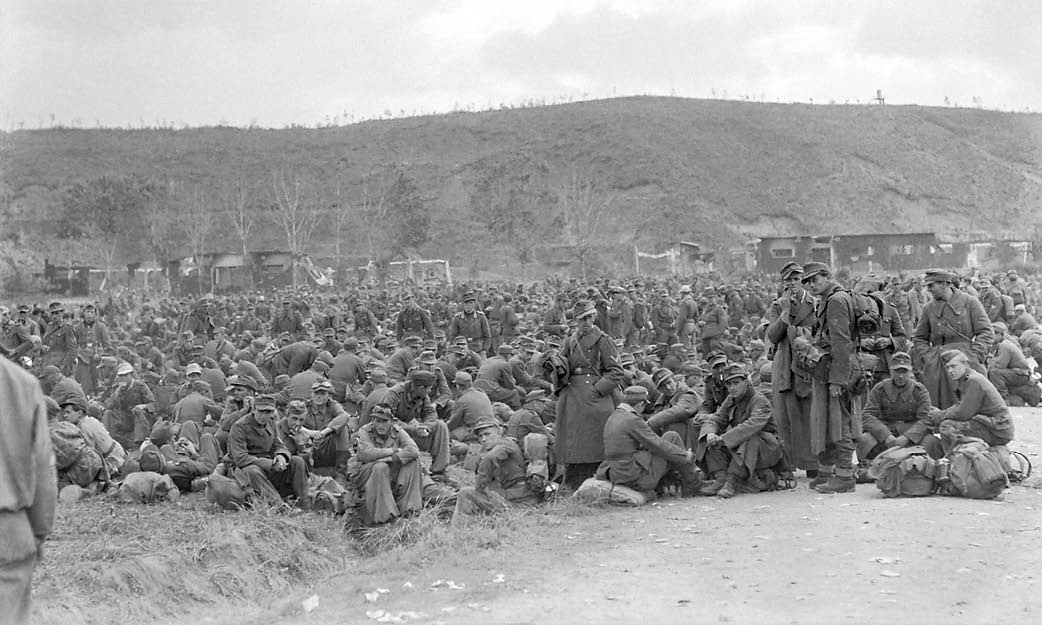
War Prisoners of the 148th

At this moment men of the 2nd Company of the 6th Infantry Regiment, (Major Oest), supported by American tanks, advanced to capture Felegara, which was already occupied by 3rd Company of the 6th Infantry Regiment and Pitaluga's squadron. With Felegara surrounded, the siege was complete and the German forces retreated to Fornovo Di Taro's downtown. Besieged, the Germans started negotiations to surrender all their forces to Brazilian command. These forces were from the 148th German Infantry Division, the remnants of an Italian Bersaglieri and Alpini Divisions and the 90th Panzer Grenadier Division. On April 29, 1945, the 1st Company of the 6th Infantry Regiment command post were located at Fornovo-Ponte Scodogna; also present was the four-star General Mascarenhas de Moraes, Commander-in-Chief of the Brazilian forces. Representatives of the German forces showed up to start surrender negotiations. Colonel Floriano de Lima Brayner, represented the Brazilian's forces; at 1 PM, 13 ambulances with 400 wounded German officers and soldiers arrived. They were immediately removed to the Brazilian campaign hospital at Modena. An hour and half later, another eight ambulances arrived with more wounded men. The first fighting unit to surrender was the 36th Regiment of the 9th motorized division. The troops laid down their arms beside the Collechio-Fornovo-Berceto Road. There were infantry weapons (PAK - Panzer Abwehr Kanone) of several calibers, 75 and 150 mm mortars, many kinds of vehicles, a column of 105 mm artillery pieces, 88 mm guns mounted on halftracks, 80 in total. There was also much ammunition of all types. Over the next 20 hours, 14,779 men surrendered to Brazilian forces. Also captured were 4,000 horses, 2,500 vehicles and 1,000 motor cycles. Italian general Mario Carloni and Lieutenant General Otto Fretter-Pico with all his staff capitulated. The 5th Army commander, General Mark Clark, said: " A magnificent end to a magnificent campaign!"

== War crimes ==
The division has been implicated in one recorded war crime, the Regnano Castello massacre (Tuscany), on 23 November 1944, when 14 civilians were executed.

== Commanding officers ==
The 148th Division had a number of commanders in its reserve phase, with General Hermann Böttcher serving twice. When it was activated as an infantry division, it was commanded solely by General Otto Fretter-Pico. Some sources, including Samuel W. Mitcham in the first volume of his work German Order of Battle, incorrectly list Lieutenant General Otto Schönherr Edler von Schönleiten as the commander from 20 March 1944. This is based on a transposition of numbers, as Otto Schönherr took command of Division No. 418 (German: Division Nr. 418), also a reserve and training division.

=== 148th Reserve Division ===
| No. | Rank | Name | Mandate |
|---|---|---|---|
| 1 | Generalmajor | Konrad Stephanus | 1 December 1939 – 7 February 1940 |
| 2 | Generalleutnant | Hermann Böttcher | 7 February 1940 – 10 February 1942 |
| 3 | Generalleutnant | Hubert Gercke | 10 February 1942 – 2 April 1942 |
| 4 | Generalleutnant | Hermann Böttcher | 2 April 1942 – 1 April 1943 |
| 5 | Generalleutnant | Friedrich-Wilhelm von Rothkirch und Panthen | 1 April 1943 – 25 September 1943 |
| 6 | Generalmajor | Otto Fretter-Pico | 25 September 1943 – 18 September 1944 |

=== 148th Infantry Division ===
| No. | Rank | Name | Mandate | Notes |
|---|---|---|---|---|
| 1 | Generalmajor Generalleutnant | Otto Fretter-Pico | 18 September 1944 – 28 April 1945 | Promoted on 9 October 1944 |

== Bibliography ==
- Mitcham, Samuel W. (1985). Hitler's Legions: The German Army Order of Battle, World War II. New York: Stein and Day. p. 540. ISBN 978-0-8128-2992-1. OCLC 11113727.
- Gassend, Jean-Loup (2014). Operation Dragoon: Autopsy of a Battle: The Allied Liberation of the French Riviera: August-September 1944. Atglen, Pennsylvania: Schiffer Publications. p. 560. ISBN 978-0-7643-4580-7. OCLC 1474513651.
