= Ferdinand Neuling =

German army general

- Born: 22 August 1885; Bautzen, German Empire
- Died: 20 February 1960 (aged 74); Hildesheim, West Germany
- Military career
- Allegiance: German Empire; Weimar Republic; Nazi Germany
- Service years: 1905–1945
- Rank: General der Infanterie
- Units: Landwehr Oppeln; 239th Infantry Division; LXII Army Corps
- Conflicts: World War II; Invasion of Poland; Battle of France; Liberation of France
- Awards: Knight's Cross of the Iron Cross

Ferdinand Neuling (22 August 1885 – 20 February 1960) was a general of the German army (Heer) during World War II. In September 1939, German troops under his command occupied the Polish part of Upper Silesia and cities of Katowice, Mikołów, Chorzów, committing numerous war crimes on Polish civilians and resistance fighters.

== Biography ==
In 1905 he joined the Kaiser's army as ensign in 139th Infantry Regiment. A year later he was promoted to lieutenant. He served in World War I and received the Iron Cross 1st and 2nd Class. After 1918, he continued service in the Reichswehr. In 1929, he was promoted to major, in 1933 to lieutenant colonel. In the same year, he took command of 23rd Infantry Regiment.

On 1 January 1939 he became General Major and three months later took command of Landwehr in Oppeln. On the eve of World War II he was ordered to create the 239th Infantry Division, basing on Landwehr soldiers. The Division's battle value was considered very low and the unit was scheduled to be used as reserve.

On 2 September 1939, his division crossed German-Polish border in Gierałtowice. The troops marched towards Ornontowice, then Mikołów. On 3 September, following the retreat of Polish Army from Upper Silesia, Neuling entered Mikołów. A day later, he seized Katowice, where was warmly greeted by local ethnic Germans. Three days later, his soldiers burned down the synagogue in Katowice.

After capturing Upper Silesia Neuling's division headed east. In October 1939 they guarded the German-Soviet border on Bug River, which was created after the fall of Poland.

In 1940 Neuling's men took part in the offensive against France, stormed the Maginot Line, and captured Colmar and Strasbourg. After that, he was put into army's reserve. From 1942 he commanded LXII ArmeeKorps in France. On 18 August 1944, his corps was crushed by advancing units of the US Army. Neuling was taken prisoner and transferred to the Clinton POW camp in Clinton, Mississippi.

He returned to Germany in 1947 and died in Hildesheim in 1960. He never faced any charges concerning crimes committed during the war.

== Awards ==
- Iron Cross (1914)
  - 2nd Class
  - 1st Class
- Knight's Cross of the Military Order of St. Henry
- Honour Cross of the World War 1914/1918
- Iron Cross (1939)
  - 2nd Class
  - 1st Class
- German Cross in Gold (19 December 1941)
- Knight's Cross of the Iron Cross on 28 February 1942 as Generalleutnant and commander of the 239. Infanterie-Division
