= 239th Infantry Division =

- 239. Infanterie-Division
- Active: August 1939 - December 1941
- Country: Nazi Germany
- Branch: Heer (Wehrmacht)
- Type: Infantry
- Size: Division

The 239th Infantry Division (German: 239. Infanterie-Division) was an Infantry Division of the German Heer during World War II. The division was activated in 1939 and remained in active duty until December 1941. Its staff was formally dissolved in 1942.

== Operational history ==
The 239th Infantry Division was created on 26 August 1939 as part of the third Aufstellungswelle in Gleiwitz in Wehrkreis VIII. The division initially consisted of the Infantry Regiments 372 (Cosel), 372 (Beuthen) and 444 (Oppeln), as well as the Artillery Regiment 239. The division's only commander throughout its lifespan was Ferdinand Neuling.

During the Invasion of Poland, the 239th Infantry Division served on the border between Poland and Slovakia, but did not see any fighting. It was part of the reserves of Army Group South (von Rundstedt), as part of VIII Army Corps (Busch) under 14th Army (List). By November 1939, it had joined XXXIV Army Corps under Grenz-Abschnittskommando Süd along the German-Soviet demarcation line. In June 1940 the division stood by as part of the 7th Army's (Dollmann) reserves under Army Group C (von Leeb) during the Battle of France.

The 239th Infantry Division was dissolved in December 1941 while part of the 6th Army on the Eastern Front, as a result of irrecoverable casualties. The divisional personnel was distributed to neighboring divisions. The staff officers of the 239th Infantry Division remained on duty as a z.b.V. divisional staff with 6th Army. This z.b.V. staff was eventually dissolved on 26 March 1942 and its members integrated into the 294th Infantry Division, marking the end of the 239th Infantry Division as a military unit. The division's commander, Neuling, would go on to command the LXII Reserve Corps from September 1942 until its surrender in Marseille in August 1944.

== Noteworthy individuals ==
- Ferdinand Neuling, divisional commander from 1939 to 1942.
