= Pierre Vilars =

French military officer (1916–2024)

- Born: 5 August 1916; Mont-Saint-Aignan, France
- Died: 19 September 2024 (aged 108); Vannes, France
- Education: École d'Arts et Métiers
- Occupation: Military officer

Pierre Vilars (5 August 1916 – 19 September 2024) was a French military officer. He was a veteran of World War II and one of the last remaining French survivors of Operation Dragoon.

== Biography ==
Born in Mont-Saint-Aignan on 5 August 1916, Vilars became an engineer after his studies at the École d'Arts et Métiers. He specialized in the plastic industry.

A sub-lieutenant in the 111th colonial artillery regiment stationed on the Belgian border, Vilars survived the bombings of the Germans during May 1940. On 21 June 1940, he fought in the defense of Lorient during one of the last engagements of the Battle of France. However, he was taken prisoner by the Wehrmacht following France's defeat. After a year of detention at Oflag XIII-B in Nuremberg, he was freed in 1941 under the guise of his intentions to fight the English. However, he went into exile in Upper Volta and rejoined the French Free Forces under Charles de Gaulle. He was named a lieutenant in the 1re armée in March 1943 and took on the false identity of Jean-Pierre Blondel while wanted by the Germans. While in West Africa, he fought in the 13th Senegalese rifle regiment.

On 17 June 1944, Vilars participated in the Invasion of Elba. During Operation Dragoon, he landed on the beaches of Cavalaire-sur-Mer and took part in the Battle of Toulon within the 9th Colonial Infantry Division. After the help of volunteer troops from the French Forces of the Interior, he denounced attempts by the French leaders to "whitewash" the Allied momentum, paying tribute to the African forces in his regiment. His division then continued north, claiming victory in the Battle of Alsace and the Colmar Pocket with the 23rd colonial infantry regiment. In April 1945, his regiment crossed the Rhine, pushing the 19th Army until their eventual victory. On 25 May 1945, he was awarded the Croix de Guerre 1939–1945. Although he had been named captain, he was recently married and requested his immobilization from Jean Étienne Valluy who suggested he go to Indochina. He was named Chef d'escadron in 1960 and settled in Vannes in the 1970s.

Vilars had several children with his wife, Jacqueline, including a son who became a mayor. On 8 November 2021, he was named a Knight of the Legion of Honour.

Pierre Vilars died in Vannes on 19 September 2024, at the age of 108. At the time of his death, he was the fifth oldest man in France.
