= Battle of Toulon =

Battle of Toulon may refer to:

- Battle of Toulon (1744) during the War of the Austrian Succession
- Battle of Toulon (1944), a liberation of the city by French forces following Operation Dragoon

== See also ==
- Siege of Toulon (1707) during the War of the Spanish Succession
- Siege of Toulon (1793), a military operation during the French Revolutionary Wars
- Scuttling of the French fleet at Toulon during World War II
