= Hivernage =

French Army practice during the First World War

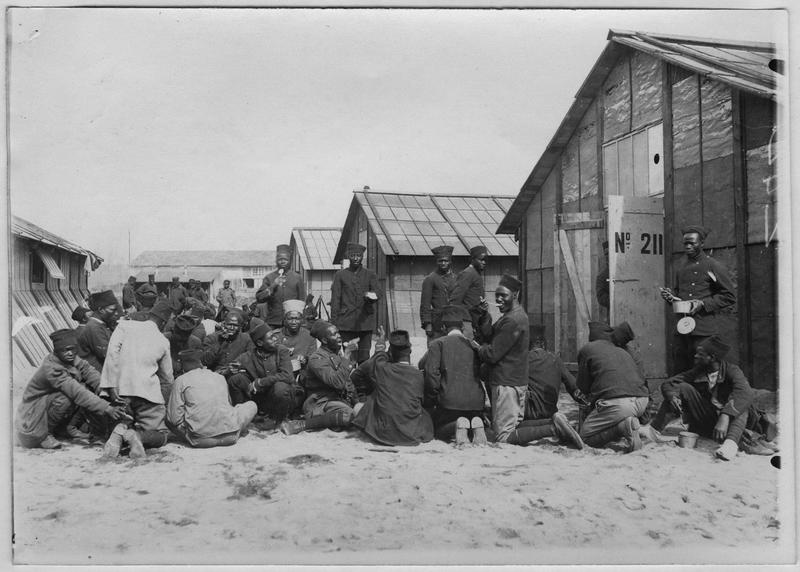
Tirailleurs at a hivernage camp at Fréjus in March 1916

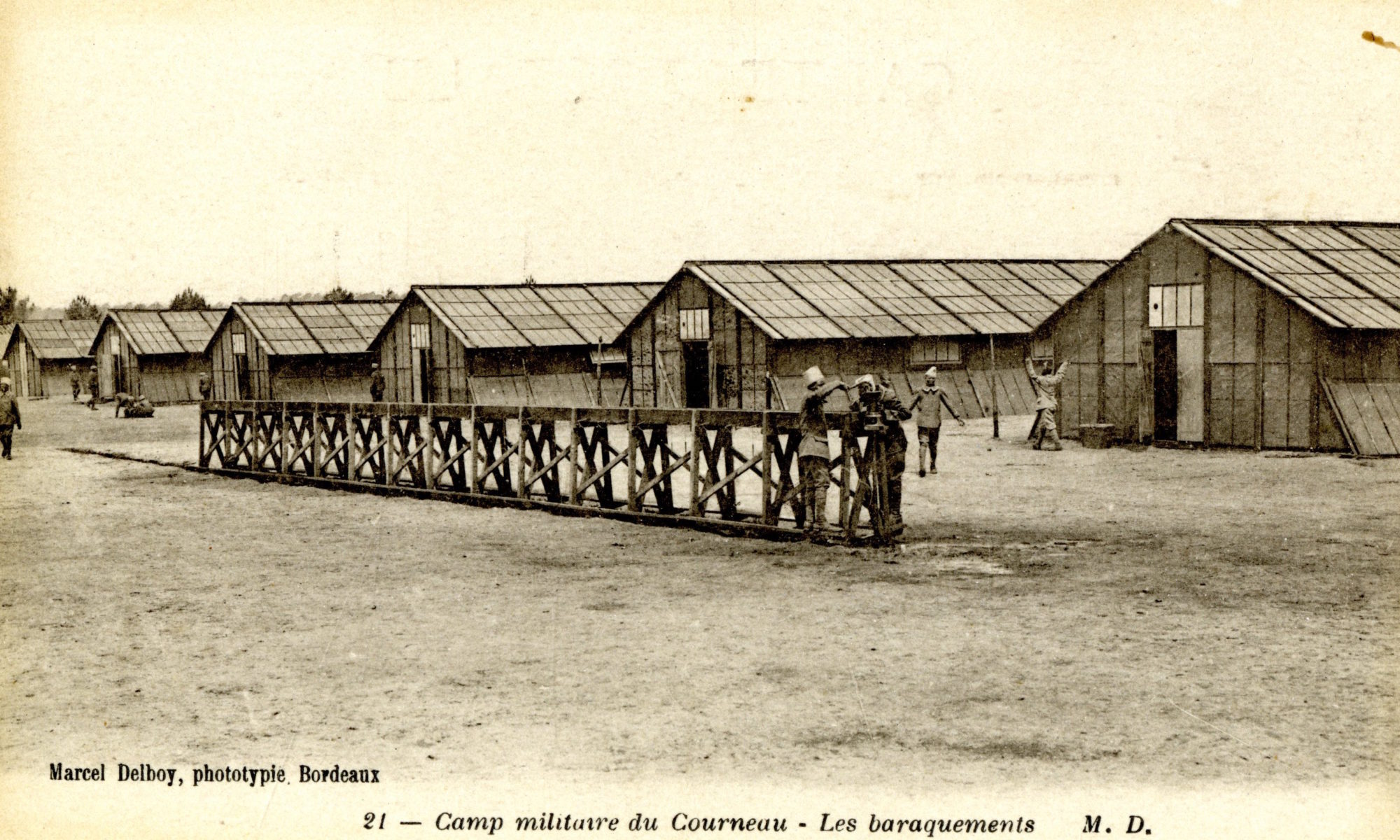
Adrian-type barracks of the hivernage camp at Courneau

Hivernage ([i.vɛʁ.naʒ], lit. 'Wintering') was the practice in the French Army of withdrawing sub-Saharan African colonial troops from colder theatres to overwinter in warmer climates. Such troops were first deployed to Morocco from 1908 and losses were experienced due to disease in colder weather. When the Senegalese Tirailleurs were deployed to France in 1914 for the First World War an informal hivernage system was implemented, with the troops withdrawn to southern France and northern Africa over winter. The system was formalised in 1915, at the instigation of black deputy Blaise Diagne, with the troops to be withdrawn between November and March. In some cases troops, particularly tirailleurs malgaches (from Madagascar), were able to remain in the field all year round.

Special camps and hospitals were established in the south of France to house the tirailleurs during the hivernage periods. The soldiers appreciated the respite, which they considered recompense for the lack of home leave, but were also required to undergo additional training in this period. The tirailleurs were able to mix with the local French population and left a positive impression. At Fréjus, a centre for hivernage, a memorial to the First World War tirailleurs was erected in 1994.

Hivernage was also practised during the Second World War between December 1939 and March 1940. The Vichy French government unsuccessfully attempted to persuade the German authorities to implement hivernage for tirailleur prisoners of war, some of whom were held in Eastern Europe. In Summer 1944 tirailleurs returned to Western Europe with the Allied invasion of France. In Winter 1944 these men were forced to hand over their arms, uniforms and equipment to white Frenchmen of the French Forces of the Interior. This was officially described as hivernage but criticised as a means of removing black soldiers from France on the eve of victory, known as the blanchiment. The disarmed tirailleurs were housed in camps in France, Britain and Africa but were badly treated and there were several disturbances, including the Thiaroye massacre, before the end of the war.

== Pre-war ==
Senegalese troops leave for Morocco, 1908

Sub-Saharan African troops from the French Colonial Army (except for Madagascan troops, known as the tirailleurs malgaches) were known as Senegalese tirailleurs, regardless of their origin. These troops were first deployed outside of the tropics or Sahel regions during the pacification of Morocco from 1908. The deployment served as a test for the practice, with the French high command monitoring losses and the state of morale of the units deployed in the field. The French government was keen to see whether the Senegalese tirailleurs could survive a deployment to the harsher climates of the Atlas Mountains and the Atlantic coast. If successful it would suggest that the tirailleurs could be used to garrison Metropolitan France or other non-tropical portions of the French Empire. It was discovered that the tirailleurs suffered heavy losses from disease in the early winter storms in the Atlas and that they were best deployed to warmer climates for the winter period. In 1910, then colonel Charles Mangin advocated the quick and massive use of colonial troops in the event of a war in Europe in his book "La Force Noire" (The Black Strength).

== First World War ==
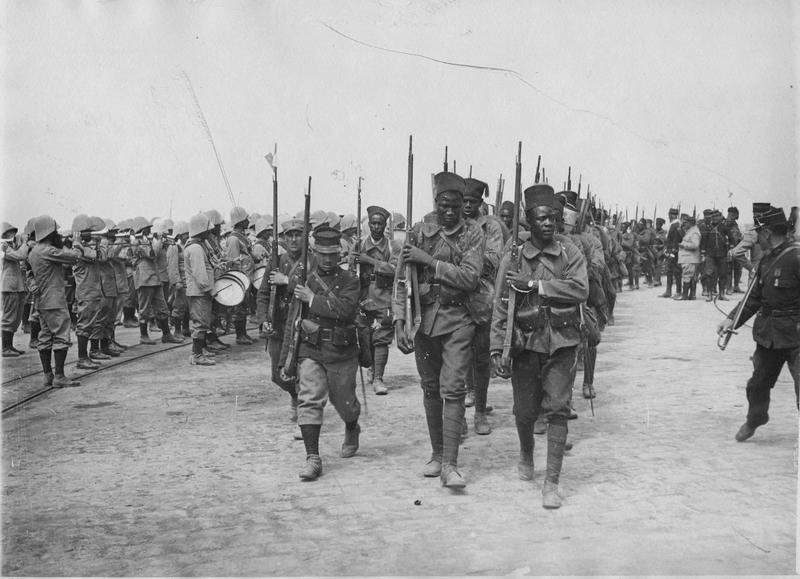
Tirailleurs leave Morocco for France, May 1916

Senegalese tirailleurs were deployed to Metropolitan France in September 1914, soon after the outbreak of the First World War. These troops were transferred direct from Morocco without any period of acclimatisation and thrown into the action on the Western Front. Casualties were heavy from enemy action and disease in the cold, damp climate of Northern France.

Later in 1914 the French Army introduced hivernage for Senegalese tirailleurs serving in France. The name was adopted from the French term then in use for the Sahel rainy season (which ran from June to September), but the hivernage on the Western Front lasted from late Autumn to Early Spring. During hivernage Senegalese tirailleurs would be posted to the warmer climates of Southern France or Northern Africa (in Oran, Biskra, Tolga and Gabès). The North African camps offered the best conditions for hivernage except for the shortage of transport ships. Colonial contingents had to wait for weeks sometimes before a ship was available to bring them back to Europe, making it difficult to maintain their rotation between the front and North Africa.

=== Camps ===
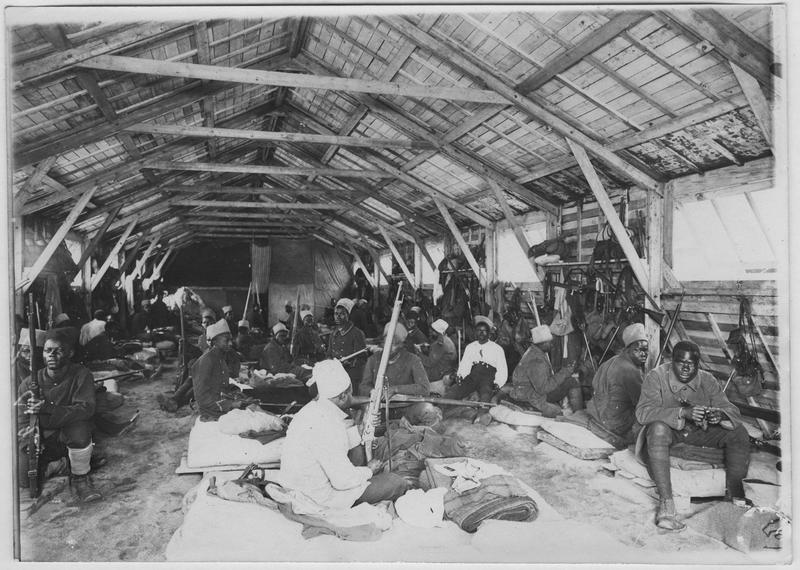
the interior of an Adrian-type hut at Fréjus in March 1916

As early as 1914 Fréjus in the Var department, on France's Mediterranean coast, became a major centre for hivernage. Camps were established there to house the men and tourist hotels were converted to hospitals (as well as at Saint-Raphaël, at Menton in Alpes-Maritimes and Courneau in Gironde). The hospitals cared for those seriously wounded in battle as well as casualties from bronchial disease, which affected many of the soldiers. Efforts were made to maintain a Senegalese feel to the facilities with the hospitals decorated with scenes of African village life and the nurses, who were all male, encouraged to speak Bambara.

By 1915 the hivernage system was formalised. Senegalese tirailleurs would be sent from the front in November, not to return until the following March. During the hivernage period the troops were to practice military drill and be taught a basic form of French, the parler tirailleur. The introduction of a formal policy had been instigated by Blaise Diagne, a black deputy for the Four Communes in French West Africa; the army had initially opposed the idea. Tirailleurs were not granted the same leave privileges as white French troops, who were permitted to return home every four months. The tirailleurs considered that the hivernage was their compensation for this.

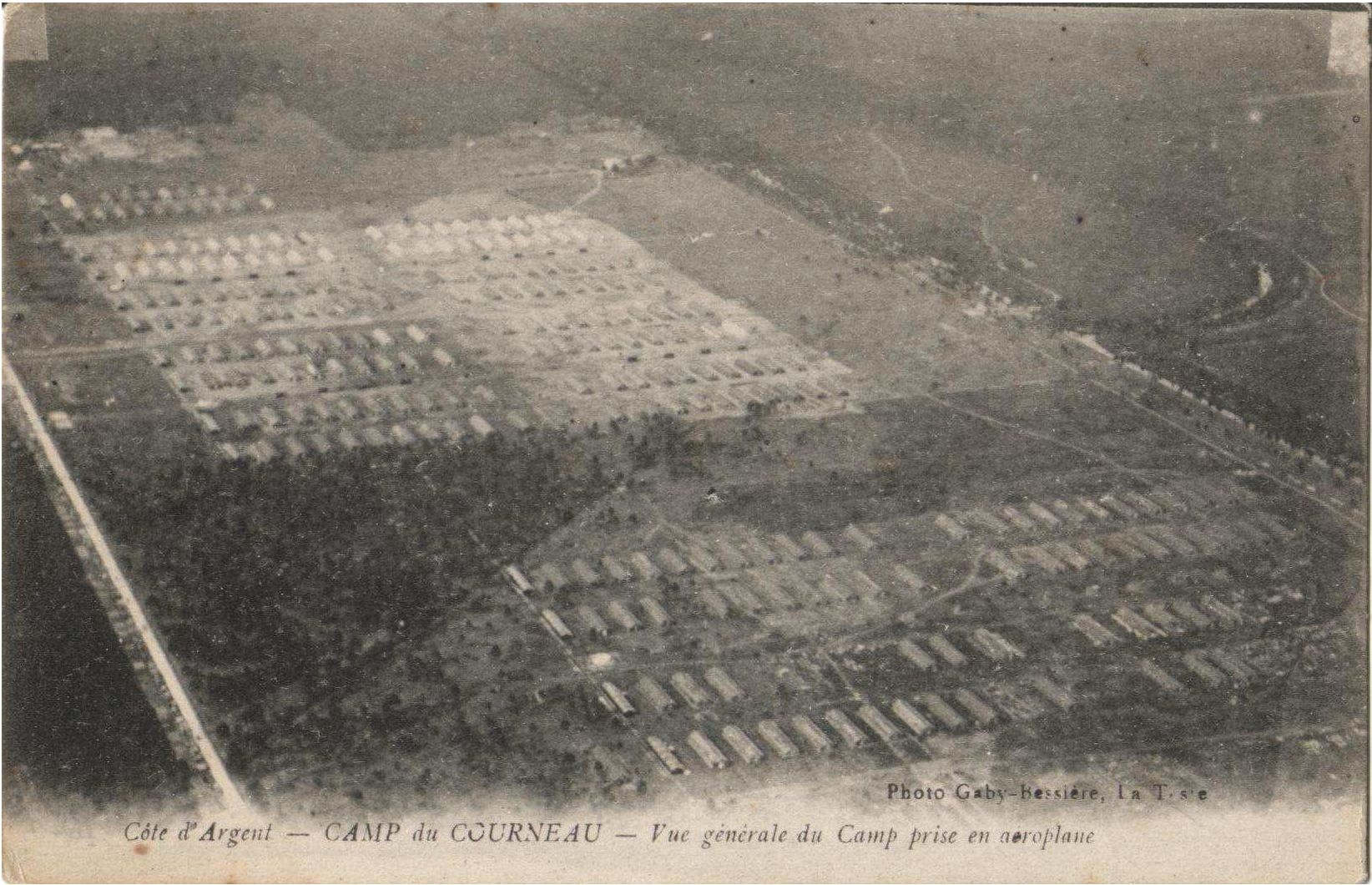
Aerial view of the Camp of Courneau (1917)

A camp with a capacity of 27000 soldiers was also set up in March 1916 at a place called "Le Courneau" in Gironde, between the road leading from La Teste to Cazaux and the canal connecting the pond of Cazaux and Sanguinet to the Arcachon Bay. It is estimated that 40,000 Senegalese tirailleurs and their staff stayed in the camp at some point, it could simultaneously accommodate about 18,000 men and their 300 officers and petty officers at the same time. It was also used a transit camp for tirailleurs en-route to hivernage in Northern Africa. The location of the camp next to a swamp, the insalubrious living conditions and the poor quality of the accommodation favoured the spread of epidemics. In September the construction of the camp was completed and more than two hundred deaths had already been suffered.

The Undersecretary of State for War in charge of the armed forces medical service Justin Godart was immediately informed of the situation in Courneau. Faced with this alarming mortality, he was left with two options: to evacuate the camp or to allow the experimentation of a vaccine against pneumococcal disease with the help of the Pasteur Institute. Godart chose the latter and the African soldiers became the subject of a vaccine experiment launched in haste by the Ministry of Defence and the Institute. The vaccination campaign began without any real prior laboratory experimentation and proved to be ineffective. The cold winter of 1916–1917 resulted in the death of more than 900 soldiers, mostly Senegalese tirailleurs.

Few raised their voices at the time to denounce the conditions but Diagne, in his speech in front of the French Chamber of Deputies in December 1916, denounced the living conditions of the tirailleurs and requested an improvement. The Senate opposed any improvement work on cost grounds and instead asked for the withdrawal of the troops to the camps of the Var or those of Oran in July 1917. Between the end of April 1916 and December 1917, more than 1,200 tirailleurs died as a result of pneumonia.

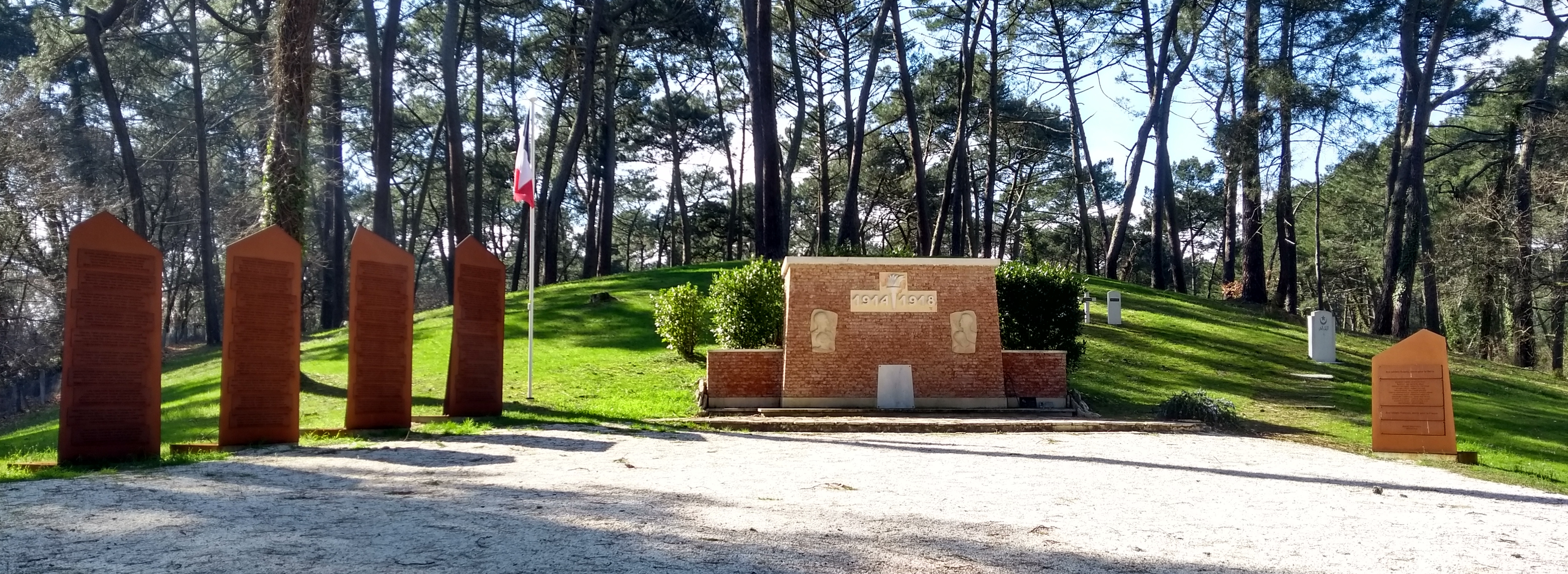
General view of the Natus National necropolis, La Teste-de-Buch (2020)

When Courneau camp was demolished in 1928, the remains of the soldiers were grouped into a mass grave at a place called "Le Natus". The site, lost in the middle of the pines, soon fell into disrepair. The veterans of La Teste-de-Buch brought it out of oblivion at the end of the 1950s. In 1965, it was decided to erect a suitable memorial monument, to fence off and clean up what was in fact a vast mass grave covering an area of 1 hectare (2.5 acres). A stele was erected with a marble plaque mentioning the "940 Senegalese and 12 Russians who died for France", in reality the deaths were more numerous and of various national origins. The site is designated as a national necropolis by the French decree of 23 May 1993 establishing the list of national necropolises, where the necropolis appeared under the name of : "Monument ossuary of the camp of Courneau" located at La Teste". In 2018, 6 steles with the names of 949 soldiers buried in the necropolis were erected by the municipality of La Teste-de-Buch.

The Senegalese hospitals in the south of France remained into the 1920s. Because of its close association with colonial troops under hivernage Fréjus became the site of a training centre for African NCOs post-war (this later became the École de formation des officiers du régime transitoire des troupes de marine). A memorial sculpture depicting First World War tirailleurs was erected in the town in 1994.

=== Interaction with civilians ===
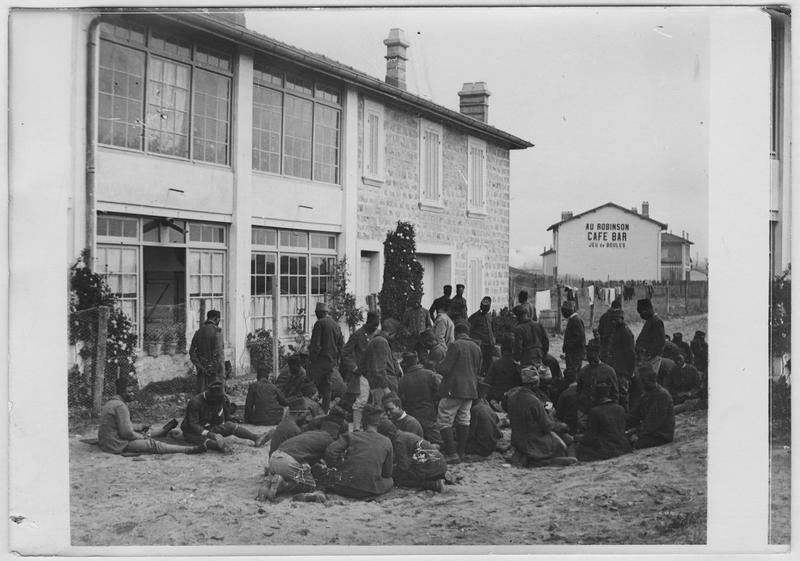
Tirailleurs outside civilian buildings in Fréjus, March 1916

During hivernage the Senegalese tirailleur had closer contact with the white civilian population than they would on colonial service. They took the opportunity to mingle with civilians and were surprised to find that Metropolitan French citizens were kinder to them than the colonial citizenry had been. The tirailleurs also generally left a positive impression upon the local population. The authorities were keen to avoid sexual relations between the tirailleurs and "respectable" white Frenchwomen (though use of brothels was permitted) and assigned marraines de guerre ("wartime godmothers"), middle-class white women, to look after the soldiers providing food, clothing and platonic companionship during hivernage. Many tirailleurs regarded their marraines as mother figures though some sexual relationships occurred.

=== Impact upon the military ===
Issues arose when commanders kept tirailleurs in the field too late in the Autumn or brought them back too early in the Spring for operational reasons. One example was General Charles Mangin who brought tirailleurs back to the field ahead of the failed April 1917 Nivelle offensive, leading to much suffering in cold and rainy conditions. As well as Senegalese troops the practice of hivernage was extended to Madagascan tirailleurs and the tirailleurs indochinois, though in practice some of these troops were able to remain in the field throughout winter provided they received good quality clothing and living conditions. Because of the practice of hivernage there were doubts among some French commanders as to the value of deploying tirailleurs outside of the tropics. The successful use of tirailleurs in Europe led to their use being expanded, particularly with regards the Madagascan troops who were integrated into heavy artillery units in 1917 in which role they were able to remain deployed throughout the year.

== Second World War ==
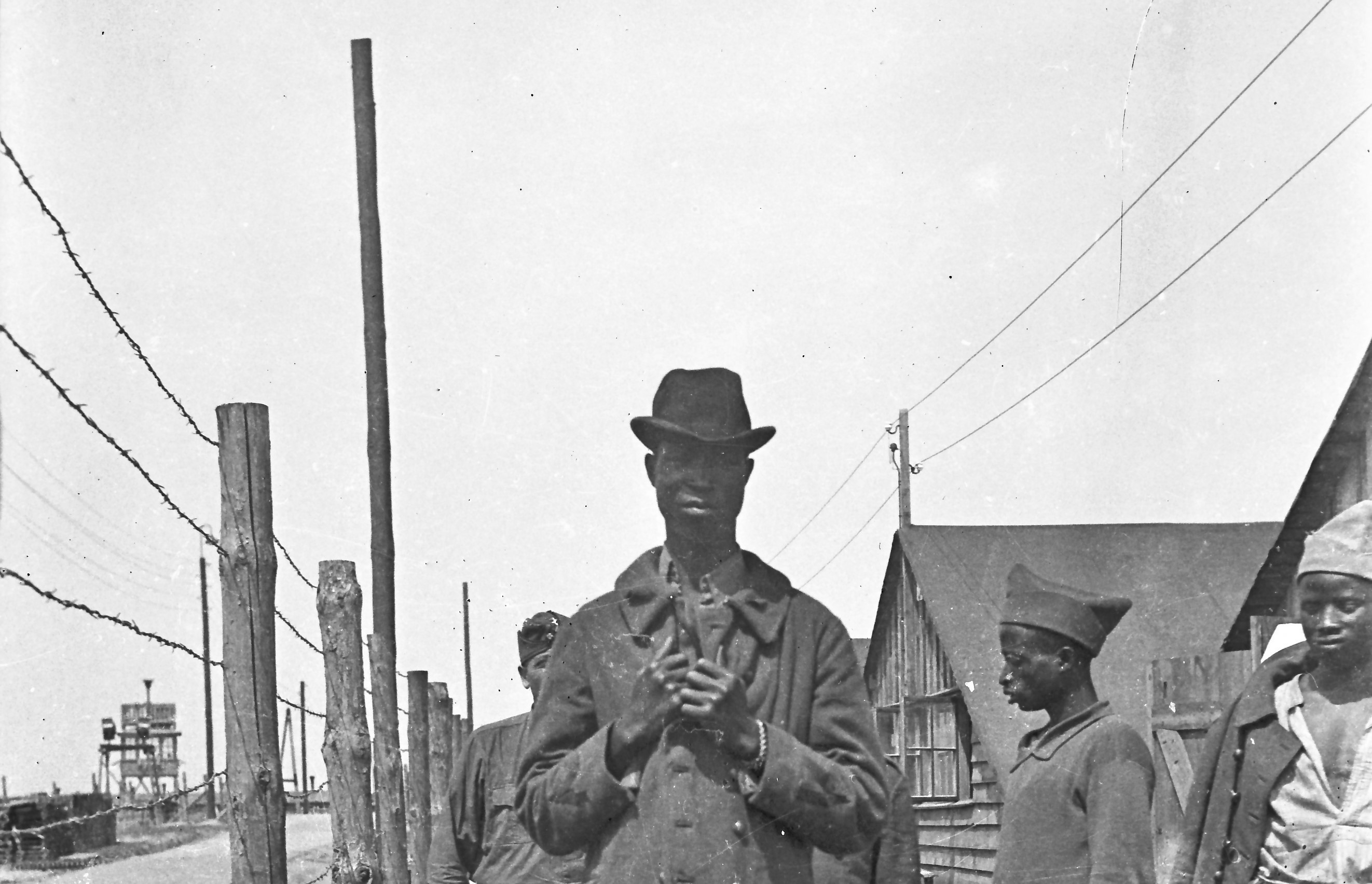
Senegalese tirailleurs held by the Germans in a prisoner of war camp in Eastern Europe circa 1944

Senegalese tirailleurs were deployed to France during the Second World War, which began in September 1939. The practice of hivernage was implemented between December 1939 and March 1940. France surrendered to Germany on 22 June 1940 and many tirailleurs were taken prisoner. The Germans held these in camps across occupied Europe, including the cold east. Georges Scapini, an official of Philippe Pétain's collaborationist government responsible for prisoners of war, unsuccessfully attempted to convince the German authorities to follow a form of hivernage by moving tirailleur prisoners south during the winter to avoid unnecessary deaths.

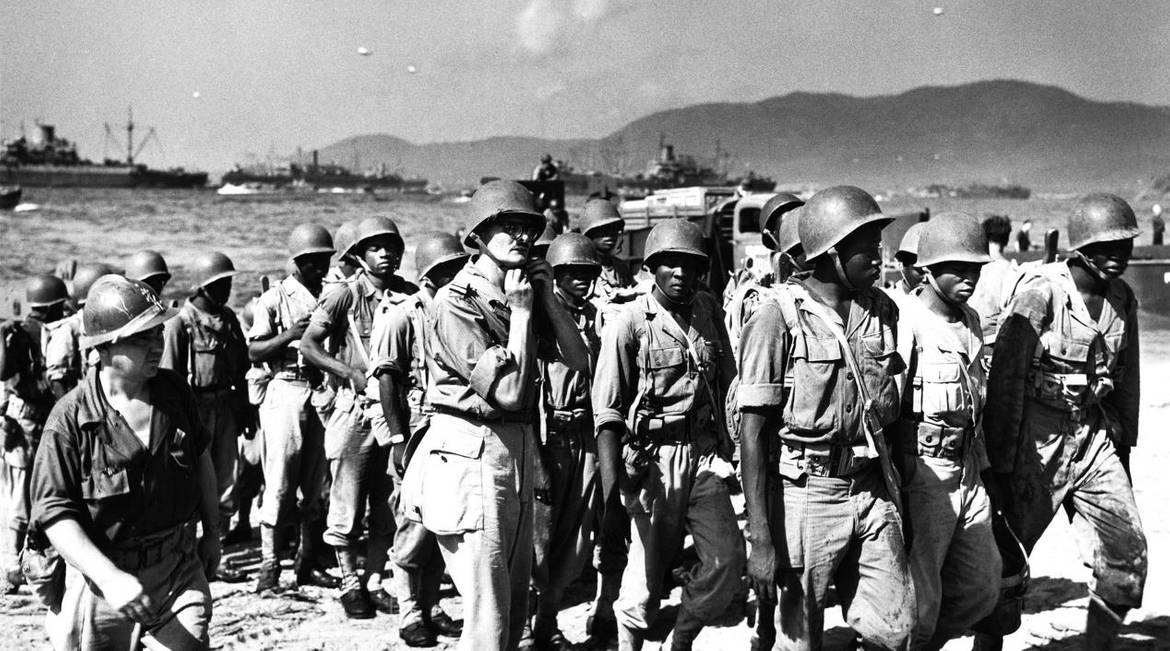
Senegalese tirraileurs land in Southern France, August 1944

Senegalese tirailleurs continued to fight alongside Free French Forces in the colonies and returned to France following the invasions of 1944. In the winter of that year the tirailleurs were forced to hand over their arms, uniforms and equipment to former resistance fighters of the French Forces of the Interior. Though formally called hivernage it has been described as the blanchiment de l’armée (the laundering or whitening of the army), removing black soldiers to create an all-white force. Many of the disarmed tirailleurs were held in camps in Europe over the cold winter of 1944–45, often poorly fed and clothed (many lacked civilian clothes to replace the uniforms they handed over), though some were held in Senegal. The tirailleurs were discontented at this turn of events, having fought for France while it was occupied they felt humiliated at being told their services were no longer required, when the Allies were on the point of complete victory.

There were some issues in the hivernage camps that winter, triggered by poor food, poor clothing, poor housing, lack of pay, alcohol bans, access to women and acts of violence by white soldiers. On two occasions this resulted in serious casualties when white French soldiers opened fire, 7 tirailleurs were wounded at Morlaix in Brittany and 35 were killed and a similar number wounded at Thiaroye in Senegal where the tirailleurs briefly held a French general captive after an uprising triggered by the confiscation of money. With the French lacking in resources they asked their British allies to house some of the tirailleurs. A group were held at Monshire Camp in Huyton near Liverpool. The British had some issues with the behaviour of the tirailleurs and arranged for the men to be shipped to Casablanca and then on to their homes in West Africa.

== See also ==
- Missiri mosque, a former French military community center inspired by sub-Saharan Islamic architecture in Fréjus
