= Johannes Bäßler =

World War II German officer in the Wehrmacht (1892–1944)

- Born: 3 May 1892
- Died: 9 November 1944 (aged 52); Vienna, Nazi Germany
- Military career
- Allegiance: German Empire; Weimar Republic; Nazi Germany
- Branch: Army
- Rank: Generalleutnant
- Commands: 9th Panzer Division; 14th Panzer Division; 242nd Infantry Division
- Conflicts: World War I World War II: Invasion of Poland; Battle of France; Invasion of Yugoslavia; Operation Barbarossa; Battle of Stalingrad; Battle of Toulon

Johannes Bäßler (3 May 1892 – 9 November 1944) was a German officer in the Wehrmacht during World War II who also served in the army of Imperial Germany during World War I. During World War II, he commanded two panzer divisions on the Eastern Front. He later commanded the 242nd Infantry Division which was stationed in the south of France. He died from wounds received during the Battle of Toulon.

== Biography ==
Born in 1892, Bäßler joined the army of Imperial Germany in early 1914 and was commissioned a leutnant (second lieutenant) in the infantry. He participated in World War I and afterwards was among the personnel retained in the postwar Reichswehr (Imperial Defence). By 1935, he was the Chief of Operations, or 1a, of the 1st Panzer Division. Promoted to oberst (colonel), from 1938 to 1939, he commanded the 4th Panzer Regiment, which was part of the 2nd Panzer Division.

Upon the outbreak of World War II, Bäßler was serving as Chief of Staff of XI Army Corps and participated in the Invasion of Poland in this capacity. He remained on the staff of XI Corps through the Battle of France, the Invasion of Yugoslavia, and Operation Barbarossa, the latter as part of Army Group South, until February 1942.

In April 1942, and now a generalmajor, (Note: In the Wehrmacht, the rank of generalmajor is equivalent to that of brigadier general in the United States Army.) he was given command of 9th Panzer Division which was then operating on the Eastern Front, around the town of Shchtschigry, to the east of Kursk. In July 1942 the division was involved in heavy fighting to secure the German northern flank around Zemlyansk, northwest of Voronezh, when Bäßler was seriously wounded and had to leave his command on 27 July 1942. Following recuperation from his wounds, on 16 November 1942, Bäßler took command of 14th Panzer Division which, at the time, was engaged in the Battle of Stalingrad. He led the division until 26 November 1942 at which time he was again wounded and evacuated from the city. He thus avoided capture when the German commanding officer Friedrich Paulus surrendered the city in early 1943.

Bäßler returned to active duty in July 1943 when he was appointed commander of the newly formed 242nd Infantry Division. His new command was initially based in northeastern Germany before being transferred to Liege in Belgium for training and occupation duties. In October 1943, the division, intended to be a static unit with little organic transport, was moved to the south of France and the following February, Bäßler was promoted to generalleutnant. (Note: The rank of generalleutnant is equivalent to that of major general in the United States Army.) The day after the launch of Operation Dragoon, the Allied invasion of Southern France in mid-August 1944, Bäßler and his division were ordered to hold the city of Toulon. The division resisted the French forces in the Battle of Toulon for ten days before Bäßler, who had been critically wounded, surrendered it on 26 August 1944. Although initially made a prisoner of war, he was repatriated to Germany shortly after his capture. He died of his wounds in a hospital in Vienna on 27 November 1944.

== Notes ==
Footnotes

Citations

Military offices
Preceded by Generalleutnant Alfred Ritter von Hubicki	Commander of 9th Panzer Division; 14 April 1942 – 26 July 1942	Succeeded by Generalmajor Heinrich-Hermann von Hülsen
Preceded by Generalleutnant Hans Freiherr von Falkenstein	Commander of 14th Panzer Division; 16 November 1942 – 26 November 1942	Succeeded by Oberst Martin Lattmann
Preceded by —	Commander of 242nd Infantry Division; 9 July 1943 – 26 August 1944	Succeeded by None, surrendered
