= Blanchiment =

The blanchiment (whitening) was the process by which black African soldiers, known as Senegalese Tirailleurs, who had fought with the Free French forces in the African campaign and the liberation of France during World War II, were withdrawn and replaced by white soldiers.

During autumn 1944, around 15,000−20,000 black African soldiers of the 9th Colonial Infantry Division and the 1st Free French Division were replaced by soldiers of the French Forces of the Interior (former Resistance fighters).

== Background ==
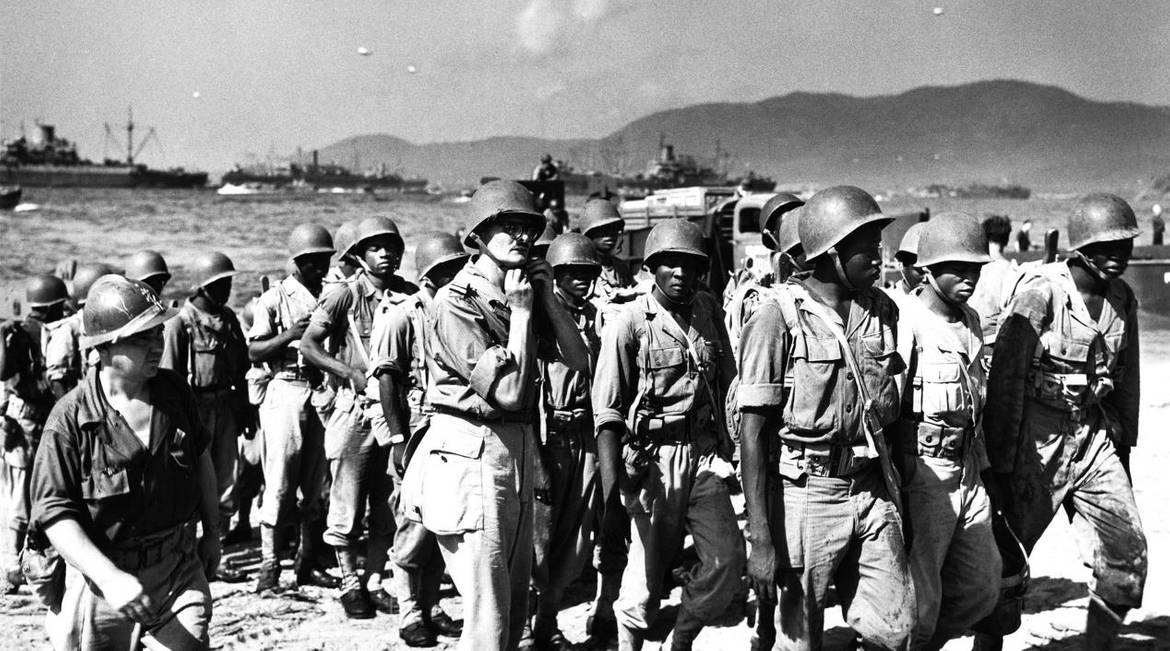
Senegalese Tirraileurs land in Southern France, August 1944

African troops made up almost a tenth of the French forces at the start of World War II.

The French 1st Army that had landed in Provence as part of Operation Dragoon in August 1944, with US forces, had over 50 percent colonial troops, Algerians, Tunisians, and Moroccans, but also soldiers from sub-Saharan Africa (French West Africa and French Equatorial Africa). Black soldiers were known as Senegalese, even though only a minority were from Senegal. The 9th Colonial Infantry Division were mainly from present-day Senegal, Niger and Burkina Faso.

In August 1944, losses in units were being filled with personnel from the French Forces of the Interior (FFI; former Resistance fighters).

== Events ==
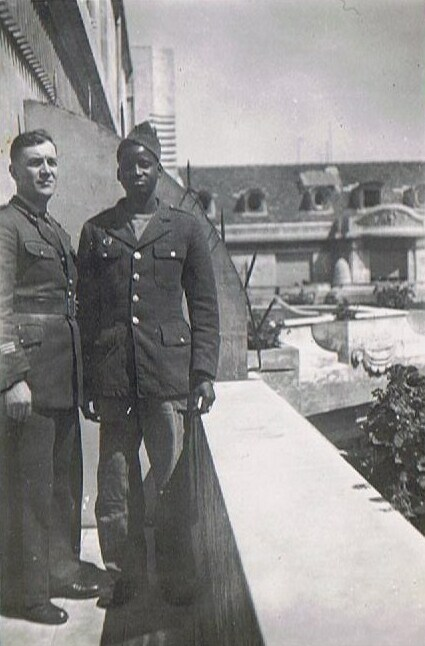
A Senegalese Tirailleur (right) in the Majestic Hotel (then a hospital) in Cannes in July 1945.

The blanchiment was focused on the 9th Colonial Infantry Division and the 1st Free French Division. Estimates for the precise number of soldiers vary from 10,000 to 20,000. Black soldiers were sent to southern France, assigned to logistics or supply duties, and/or repatriated to Africa. They had to hand over their equipment, including in some cases their uniforms, to their white replacements, with the US refusing to provide any additional equipment.

The first proposal for a large-scale redeployment came from General de Lattre de Tassigny in a note dated 7 September 1944, who wrote, "les difficultés d’emploi des troupes sénégalaises sur les théâtres d’opération du Nord-Est pendant la saison froide imposent leur transformation rapide en unités entièrement blanches?" That is, that the cold season necessitated converting to entirely white units, although other parts of the note suggest that it was not proposing replacing all the black soldiers and was in line with the existing practice of replacing losses. However, the idea for a broad replacement developed, replacing Tirailleurs with those from the French Forces of the Interior (FFI), the Maquis and new volunteers.

Different units went through the process at different speeds, but it was largely complete by the end of October 1944. Some units went through the replacement while involved with heavy fighting, as with the 4e and 6e Régiments de Tirailleurs Sénégalais.

== Consequences ==
The replacement of experienced troops with less experienced ones worsened the battle readiness of French forces, as happened with Operation Solstice in Alsace in January 1945. Housing the discharged soldiers in the South of France before they returned to Africa also presented a challenge. Many spent months in camps with inadequate supplies.

This process, and other factors including the refusal of France to pay wage arrears due to released prisoners of war, led to several incidents of violence involving the Tirailleurs. The most notable of these was the Thiaroye massacre, in December 1944 in Senegal, during which the French killed between 35 and 300 (sources vary) Tirailleurs.

== Reasons ==
Several reasons for the blanchiment are given and debated. At the time, the argument was given that this was to protect the soldiers from the cold, winter weather, with the soldiers being moved to areas with more temperate climate, a practice called hivernage that had been used in World War I and in the winter of 1939/40. There were reports of frostbite and other cold-related health problems among the black soldiers, although there were also similar reports among Moroccan soldiers and across all of the French Army.

Subsequent historians have viewed this as only a partial explanation or just an excuse. Claire Miot argues that the unsuitability of cold conditions for the black soldiers was a sincere belief among French military decision-makers, but not the whole story.

Gilles Aubagnac has argued that what drove the blanchiment was poor morale among the black troops and the need to need to incorporate troops from the FFI (against a backdrop of limited equipment and weaponry). Miot argues against the former reason, arguing that discontent among the colonial troops only arose with their demobilisation.

The US command were concerned about the presence of too many black soldiers in the French army; US forces were segregated at the time. In January 1944, General Walter Bedell Smith, Chief of Staff to General Dwight D. Eisenhower, sent a memo to the French advising them to limit the presence of black soldiers in units working alongside US troops. Charles de Gaulle wanted French forces to lead the liberation of Paris, but Allied High Command required that de Gaulle's division consist of white soldiers.

The French also wanted to present the liberation of France as being by a white army and to say France had liberated itself, with a focus on Resistance forces. There was concern that the military prestige won by the Tirailleurs would turn into demands for equality. There was also concern about contact between black soldiers and the white French population, particularly women.
