= Red Guard of Senegal =

Red Guard Légion de la garde présidentielle
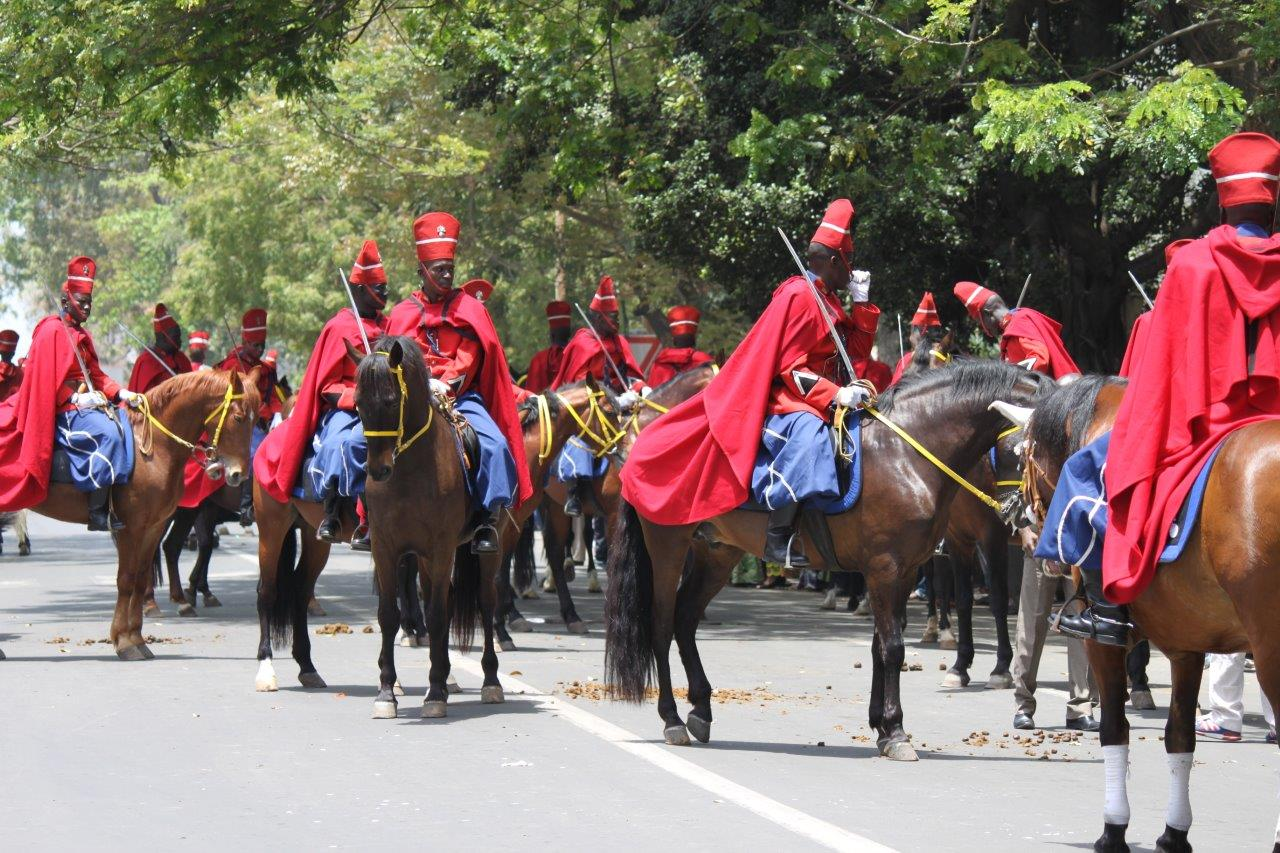
- Red Guard at Macky Sall Inauguration (2012).
- Active: 1891–present
- Country: France (1891-1960); Senegal (1960-present)
- Branch: National Gendarmerie
- Type: Cavalry
- Role: Honour Guard, Security
- Size: 120
- Part of: Security Legion of the Mobile Gendarmerie
- Garrison/HQ: Dakar

Insignia
- Identification symbol

The Red Guard of Senegal (French: Garde Rouge du Sénégal), officially known as the Presidential Guard Legion (French: Légion de la garde présidentielle; LGP), is a unit of the Senegalese Gendarmerie that is responsible for presidential security. It also has ceremonial duties and assists in general policing. It is very similar in concept to the French Republican Guard, with which it is officially twinned. The Red Guard is the direct descendant of a French colonial Spahi detachment sent to Senegal in 1845.

== Name ==
This spahi unit is also known as the Red Guard of the Presidency (Garde Rouge de la Présidence) or the Red Guard of Dakar (Garde Rouge de Dakar). The name "Red Guard" (Garde Rouge) is derived from their red tunics and burnous cloaks.

== Background and heritage ==
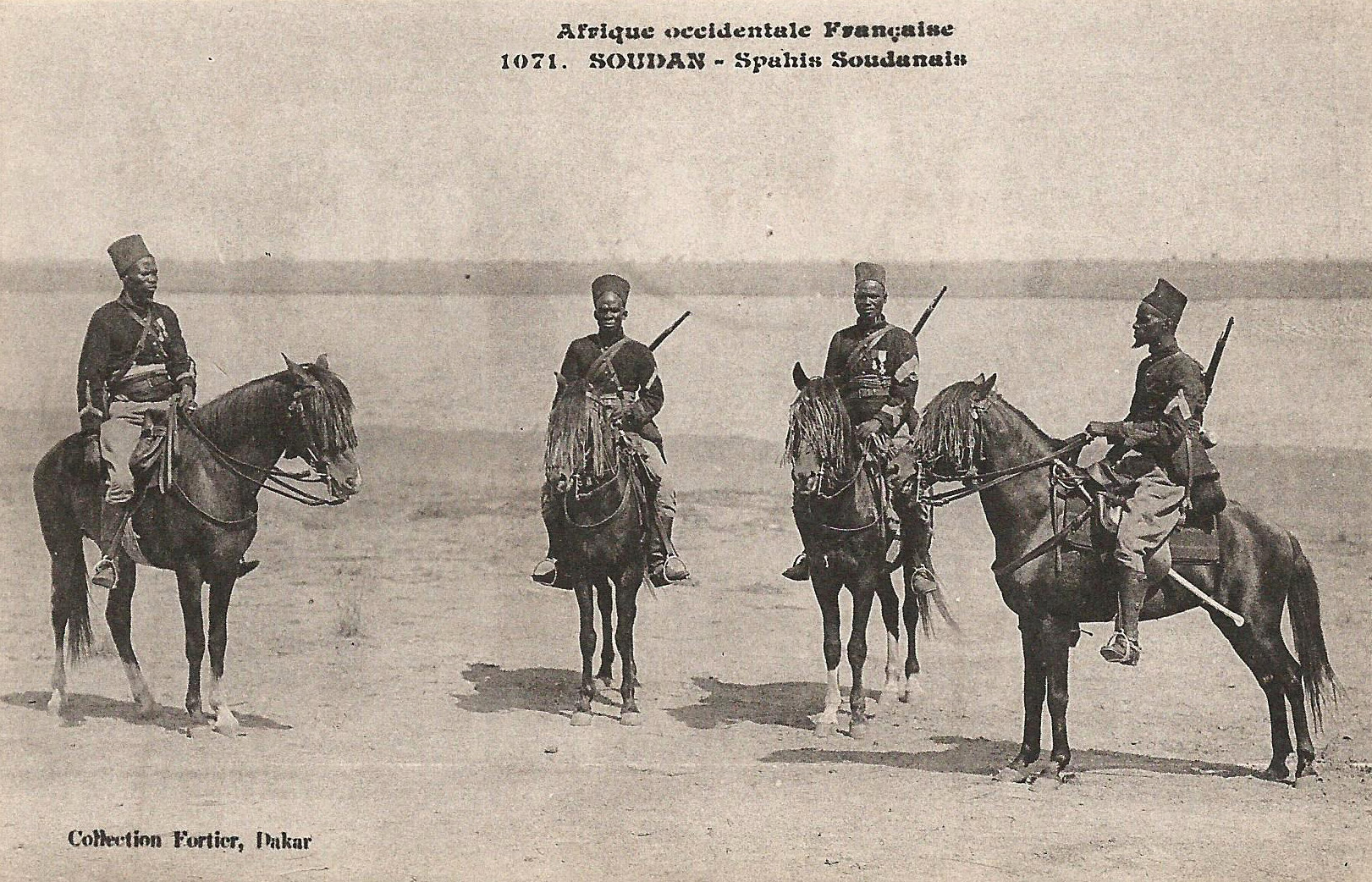
A group of Spahis in the early 1900s

French Spahis were required to range over vast areas of the Sahara desert and in 1845 a squadron was sent to Saint-Louis du Sénégal in response to tribal conflicts on the banks of the Senegal river. This detachment became a Senegalese-recruited branch of the Spahis. The Senegalese Spahis saw extensive active service in French West Africa and in Morocco over a period of 80 years. These cavalry squadrons were disbanded in 1928 as a cost-saving measure but provided the basis for a newly raised mounted gendarmerie.

In the twentieth century the Senegalese spahis were known as the "Colonial Guard" (Garde coloniale) of the "Colonial Gendarmerie". In 1960, on independence, the Colonial Guard was renamed "Presidential Guard" (Garde présidentielle), while the Colonial Gendarmerie as a whole became the National Gendarmerie.

The Red Guard places great emphasis on its heritage from the French empire, and considers itself "guardian of the traditions of the squadrons which distinguished themselves on countless battlefields in black Africa and Morocco, in the service of France" ("la gardienne des traditions des escadrons qui s'illustrèrent sur d'innombrables champs de batailles, tant en Afrique Noire qu'au Maroc au nom de la France")

== Organisation ==
The Red Guard is part of the Security Legion of the Mobile Gendarmerie. It is divided into three "groups of squadrons", each consisting of two squadrons.

=== Group of Presidential Guard Squadrons (GEGP) ===
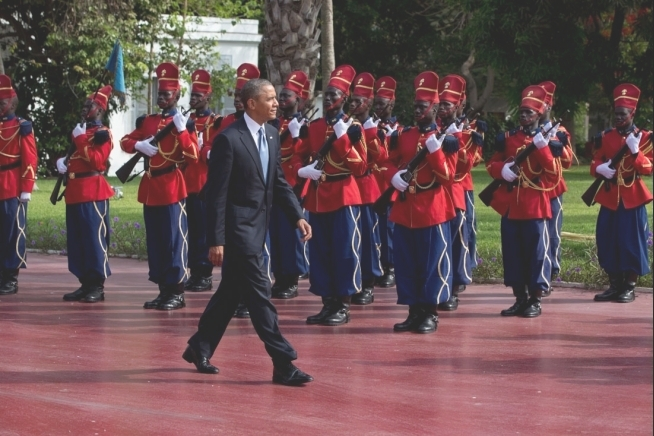
Barack Obama inspecting the Red Guard in 2013.

One squadron of this group works within the presidential palace, and the other in the vicinity of the palace.

=== Group of Protection Squadrons (GEP) ===
This group is responsible for the close personal protection of the president.

=== Group of Escort and Service Squadrons (GEES) ===
This group consists of the Mounted Squadron and the Motorcycle Squadron. The Mounted Squadron is the premier ceremonial unit of the Red Guard. It is used for visits by foreign heads of state. The guard consists of 120 cavalrymen, including a mounted band of 35 musicians. Parades are led by the band, on white horses with their tails dyed red. There are three platoons in the squadron; the 1st and 3rd platoons are mounted on bay horses, the 2nd on white horses.

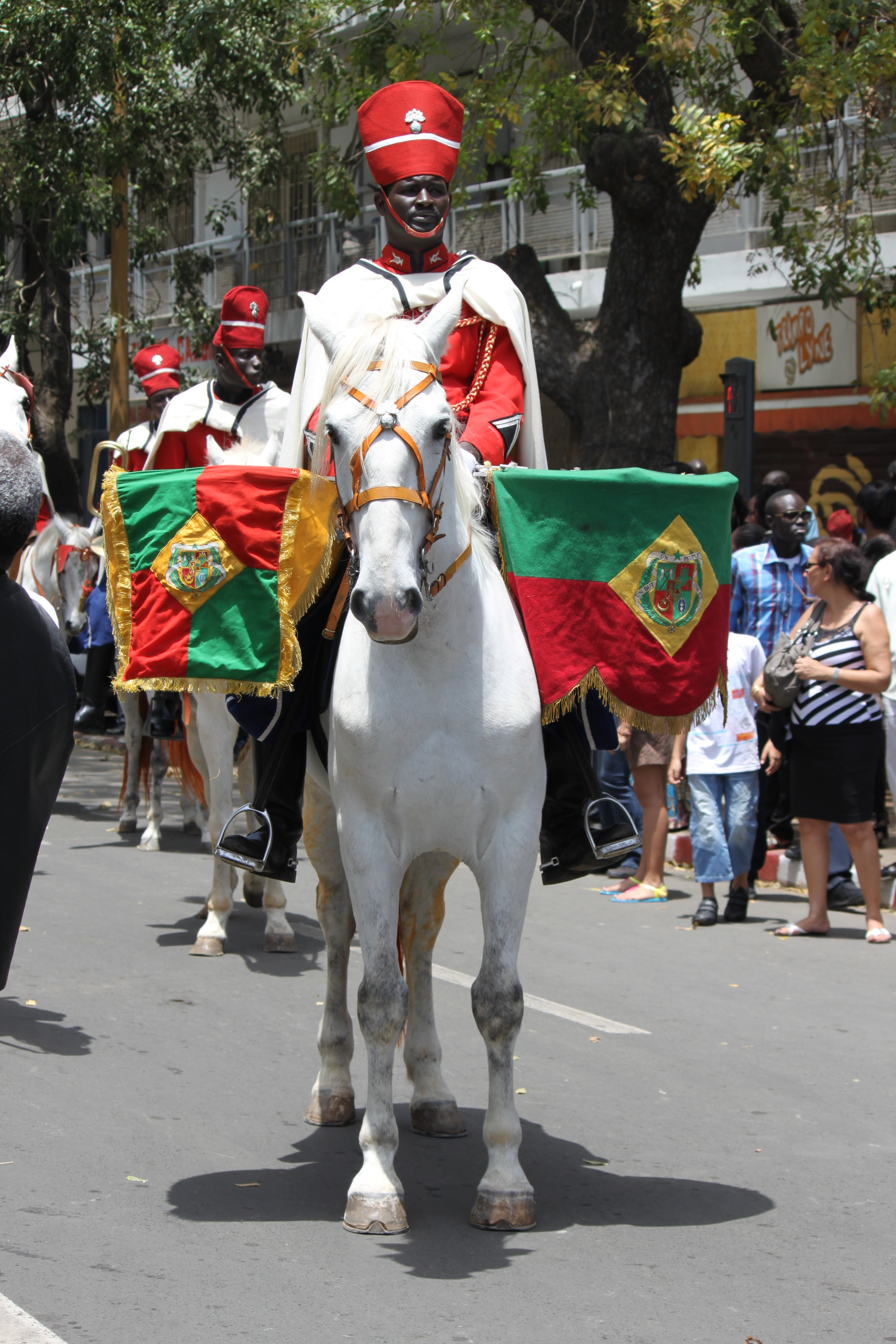
A member of the mounted band.

The squadron also fulfils mounted police duties for the maintenance of public order, notably on beaches.

The Motorcycle Squadron provides a road escort for presidential convoys and for similar convoys (e.g. for the Senegalese prime minister and visiting dignitaries from abroad). The squadron can also provide ordinary traffic police services.
