= Heinrich-Hermann von Hülsen =

- Born: 8 July 1895; Weimar, Grand Duchy of Saxe-Weimar-Eisenach, German Empire
- Died: 6 June 1982 (aged 86); Celle, Lower Saxony, West Germany
- Relatives: ∞ 1922 Adelheid Georgine Toni Anna Hildegard von Schierstaedt; 6 children Walter von Hülsen (father); Bernhard von Hülsen (uncle)
- Military career
- Allegiance: German Empire; Weimar Republic; Nazi Germany
- Branch: Imperial German Army; Reichsheer; German Army
- Service years: 1914–1945
- Rank: Generalmajor
- Unit: 9. Panzer-Division
- Commands: 9th Rifle Brigade; 9th Panzer Grenadier Regiment; 21. Panzer-Division
- Conflicts: World War I World War II: Invasion of Poland; Operation Barbarossa; Battle of the Caucasus; North African Campaign
- Awards: Iron Cross; German Cross in Gold

Heinrich-Hermann Franz Mario Walter Lobegott von Hülsen (8 July 1895 – 6 June 1982) was a decorated Generalmajor in the Wehrmacht during World War II, who commanded two armoured divisions.

== Life ==
Heinrich-Hermann, son and second child of General of the Infantry Walter Rudolf Hugo Alexander Lobegott von Hülsen (1863–1947) and his wife Irmgard Bernhardine Klara Florentine Madlene Gotthelfe, née von Keudell (1874–1955), attended the elementary school of the Kaiser-Wilhelm-Gymnasium (KWG) in Hanover from Easter 1901 to November 1905, then he attended the Kaiserin-Augusta-Gymnasium in Charlottenburg until 1 July 1906. From 15 September 1906 to April 1910, he attended the cadet school in Plön, he then transferred to the Royal Prussian Main Cadet Institute (Hauptkadettenanstalt in Groß-Lichterfelde) near Berlin where he became a cadet with honors and served for a time as a page to Empress Auguste Viktoria (1858–1921). On 13 August 1914, because of his extraordinary achievements, he was transferred to the 4th Guards Regiment of Foot as a commissioned 2nd Lieutenant.

=== WWII ===
Hülsen commanded the 44th Reconnaissance Battalion of 44th Infantry Division into the Invasion of Poland at the beginning of World War II, and led this unit until 5 December 1939. He then served as Adjutant in the high command of 1st Army until 1 April 1941, and was promoted to Oberst on 1 December 1940 during this service. On 1 April 1941 he took command of the 2nd Mounted Regiment, which he led into Operation Barbarossa, until he was called back into reserve on 1 December 1941, and was awarded the German Cross in Gold on 2 November 1941.

On 25 May 1942 he took command of the 9th Rifle Brigade under 9. Panzer-Division, which he led in the southern theater of the Eastern Front until 5 July 1942. Taking command of the 9th Panzer Grenadier Regiment until 15 December 1942, he was also named temporary commander of 9. Panzer-Division from 27 July until 3 August 1943 during this service.

Called back into reserve on 15 December 1942, he next took command of 21. Panzer-Division on 25 April 1943 in North Africa. On 13 May 1943, he was taken prisoner of war by British forces in the area of Tunis, Tunisia, two days later, he was promoted to Major General, with effect and rank seniority (RDA) from 1 May 1943, which Generaloberst Hans-Jürgen Bernhard Theodor von Arnim, Commander-in-Chief of the Army Group Africa, had already requested shortly after von Hülsens arrival in North Africa. On 16 May 1943, he was transferred to Trent Park. From summer 1944, von Hülsen was interned in Clinton, Mississippi with von Arnim and other German generals. He was repatriated on 17 February 1947.

== Promotions ==
- 13 August 1914 Leutnant (2nd Lieutenant) with Patent from 22 June 1914
  - 1 July 1922 received Reichswehr Rank Seniority (RDA) from 22 June 1914 (15)
- 17 March 1924 Oberleutnant (1st Lieutenant) with effect and RDA from 1 March 1924 (5)
- 1 February 1929 Rittmeister (1)
- 1 June 1935 Major (1)
- 31 December 1937 Oberstleutnant (Lieutenant Colonel) with effect and RDA from 1 January 1938 (62)
- 20 November 1940 Oberst (Colonel) with effect and RDA from 1 December 1940 (26)
- 15 May 1943 Generalmajor (Major General) with effect and RDA from 1 May 1943 (1c1)

== Awards and decorations ==
- Iron Cross (1914), 2nd and 1st Class
  - 2nd Class on 12 October 1914
  - 1st Class on 10 January 1917
- Royal House Order of Hohenzollern, Knight's Cross with Swords (HOH3X) on 3 May 1918
- Wound Badge (1918) in Black
- Honor saber for exceptionally good shooting with a carbine on 3 December 1930
- Honour Cross of the World War 1914/1918 with Swords on 20 December 1934
- Wehrmacht Long Service Award, 4th with 1st Class
  - 2nd Class on 2 October 1936
  - 1st Class in June 1939
- Honor saber for exceptionally good shooting with a rifle on 8 October 1938
- Anschluss Medal
- Repetition Clasp 1939 to the Iron Cross 1914, 2nd and 1st Class
  - 2nd Class on 23 September 1939
  - 1st Class on 1 October 1939
- Wound Badge (1939) in Silver on 28 August 1941
- German Cross in Gold on 1 November 1941
- Panzer Badge in Bronze on 3 December 1942

== Sources ==
- German Federal Archives: BArch PERS 6/1415 and PERS 6/299918

Military offices
| Preceded by Generalleutnant Johannes Bäßler | Commander of 9. Panzer-Division; 27 July 1942 – 8 August 1942 | Succeeded by Generalleutnant Walter Scheller |
| Preceded by Generalleutnant Hans-Georg Hildebrandt | Commander of 21. Panzer-Division; 15 March 1943 – 13 May 1943 | Succeeded by unit surrendered to British forces |
