= 242nd Infantry Division (Wehrmacht) =

- 242. Infanterie-Division
- Active: 9 July 1943 – 7 October 1944
- Country: Nazi Germany
- Branch: Army
- Type: Static infantry, Infantry
- Size: Division
- Engagements: Operation Dragoon; Battle of Toulon

Commanders
- Commander: Johannes Bäßler

The 242nd Infantry Division was an infantry division of the German Army in World War II.

== World War II ==
242. Infanterie-Division was formed in Gross-Born (Borne Sulinowo) on 9 July 1943, when Division A, formed from convalescents of the disbanded 298. Infanterie-Division, was re-designated. From 8 August to 5 October 1943, the unit was subordinated to 15th Army in Antwerp and Gent in Belgium, before being transferred to 19th Army under Army Group G in Toulon, France.

In 1944, the division fought against the Western Allies in Operation Dragoon. After being ordered to defend Toulon to the last bullet, and to give the rest of Army Group G a chance to withdraw, Generalleutnant Johannes Bäßler and his 242nd division held out for 10 days, until 26 August 1944, when Bäßler was critically wounded and surrendered the division. The division was formally disbanded on 7 October 1944.

== Order of Battle 1944 ==
Commanders

- Generalleutnant Johannes Bäßler - in command from formation (20 July 1943) until 26 August 1944

Units

- 765th Grenadier Regiment (4 battalions)
- 917th Grenadier Regiment (4 battalions)
- 918th Grenadier Regiment (4 battalions)
- 242nd Artillery Regiment (3 battalions)
- 242nd Panzerjäger Battalion
- 242nd Reconnaissance Battalion
- 242nd Pioneer Battalion
- 242nd Signals Battalion
- 242nd Division Support Units

The fourth battalions of all three Grenadier regiments were battalions of the Ostlegionen conscripts from Poland and Russia.
