= National Gendarmerie (Senegal) =

Militarised police force in Senegal

National Gendarmerie Gendarmerie nationale
- Logo of Senegalese National Gendarmerie

Agency overview
- Formed: 1963
- Employees: 10,858

Jurisdictional structure
- Operations jurisdiction: Senegal
- Constituting instrument: Decree No. 63-294 of 11 May 1963
- General nature: Gendarmerie

Operational structure
- Headquarters: Dakar
- Agency executive: General of the Army Moussa Fall, High Commander of the Gendarmerie and Director of Military Justice
- Parent agency: Armed Forces of Senegal

Website
- www.gendarmerie.sn

The Senegalese National Gendarmerie (French: Gendarmerie nationale) is one of two national law enforcement force of Senegal (the other being the Police Force), serving as a branch of the Armed Forces of Senegal. As a military unit, it is placed under the jurisdiction of the Ministry of Armed Forces. It is similar in nature to their French counterparts as well as the State Police in the U.S. It is one of the largest African contributors to peacekeeping missions around the world.

== History ==
=== Origins ===
The history of the Senegalese gendarmerie is closely linked to that of the Red Guard of Senegal. It evolved from a French colonial Spahi detachment sent to Senegal in 1845. This detachment (which became today's Red Guard) was the cadre around which the "Colonial Gendarmerie" was formed. In 1854, a detachment of gendarmes on foot was created by the imperial decree of 30 September.

=== Colonial Gendarmerie ===
On 1 January 1928, by a decree of the Governor-General of French West Africa, the "Mobile Gendarmerie Group " of Dakar was created. This unit, commanded by a lieutenant, was made of two platoons of auxiliaries on horseback, each commanded by a chief marshal. They were responsible for the personal care of the Governor General. It developed under the direction of Captain Gaston Merhle from 1921 to 1941, then under reforms in the 1950s. In 1957, the Gendarmerie group of Senegal was established by ministerial decision of November 27. In 1958, the first Senegalese police cadets were recruited.

=== Independence ===
In 1963, Captain Ameth Falle became the first Senegalese director of the gendarmerie. In 1963, Decree No. 63-294 of May 11 organized the Senegalese National Gendarmerie as an integral part of the Senegalese Armed Forces. In October 1965, a decree organized the General Inspectorate of the Gendarmerie and the Senegalese Republican Guard, while it was confirmed as a service branch in 1968. In the first decade of independence, the 1,600-member National Gendarmerie, which was controlled by the president through the minister of state for the armed forces, maintained "legions" in the country's seven regions, divided into smaller brigades.

In the following years, the Gendarmerie included an intervention legion in 1976, as well as the Intervention Group of the Senegalese National Gendarmerie (GIGNS) in 1977, the reorganization of the high command in 1991, the opening of recruitment to women in 2006 and the creation of a School for National Gendarmerie Officers (EOGN) in 2007, in Ouakam.

== Organization ==
It includes about 10,858 officers and NCOs, many of whom are often trained in France.

=== Command ===
The commander is General Moussa Fall, whose rank is divisional general, and whose full job title is "High Commander of the Gendarmerie and Director of Military Justice". He is assisted by a Second High Commandant. The main missions of the gendarmerie are to ensure public safety and to ensure the maintenance of order and the execution of laws and regulations.

=== Overall structure ===
- Central Office of the High Command
  - Chief of staff
  - Aide-de-camp
  - Private Secretariat.
  - International Relations Division
  - Communication Division
  - Social Action Division
- Staff
  - Cabinet
  - Gendarmerie Operations Center
  - General Mail Office
- Internal Inspection
  - Technical Inspector of the Territorial Gendarmerie
  - Mobile Gendarmerie Technical Inspector
  - Technical Inspector of Administrative and Financial Affairs
  - Technical Inspector of Real Estate Affairs
  - Technical Inspector of Training and Training
- Territorial Gendarmerie Command
  - Private Secretariat
  - General Staff
    - Personnel Instruction Division
    - Employment Organization Division
- Mobile Gendarmerie Command
  - Gendarmerie Intervention Legion (LGI)
  - Legion of Security and Protection (LSP)
  - Red Guard of Senegal
  - Intervention Group (GIGN)
  - Cynogroup
- Gendarmerie Schools Command
  - National Gendarmerie Officers School (EOGN)
  - Gendarmerie School
- Administration and support organization
  - Administrative Center
  - Technical Center
  - Health Service

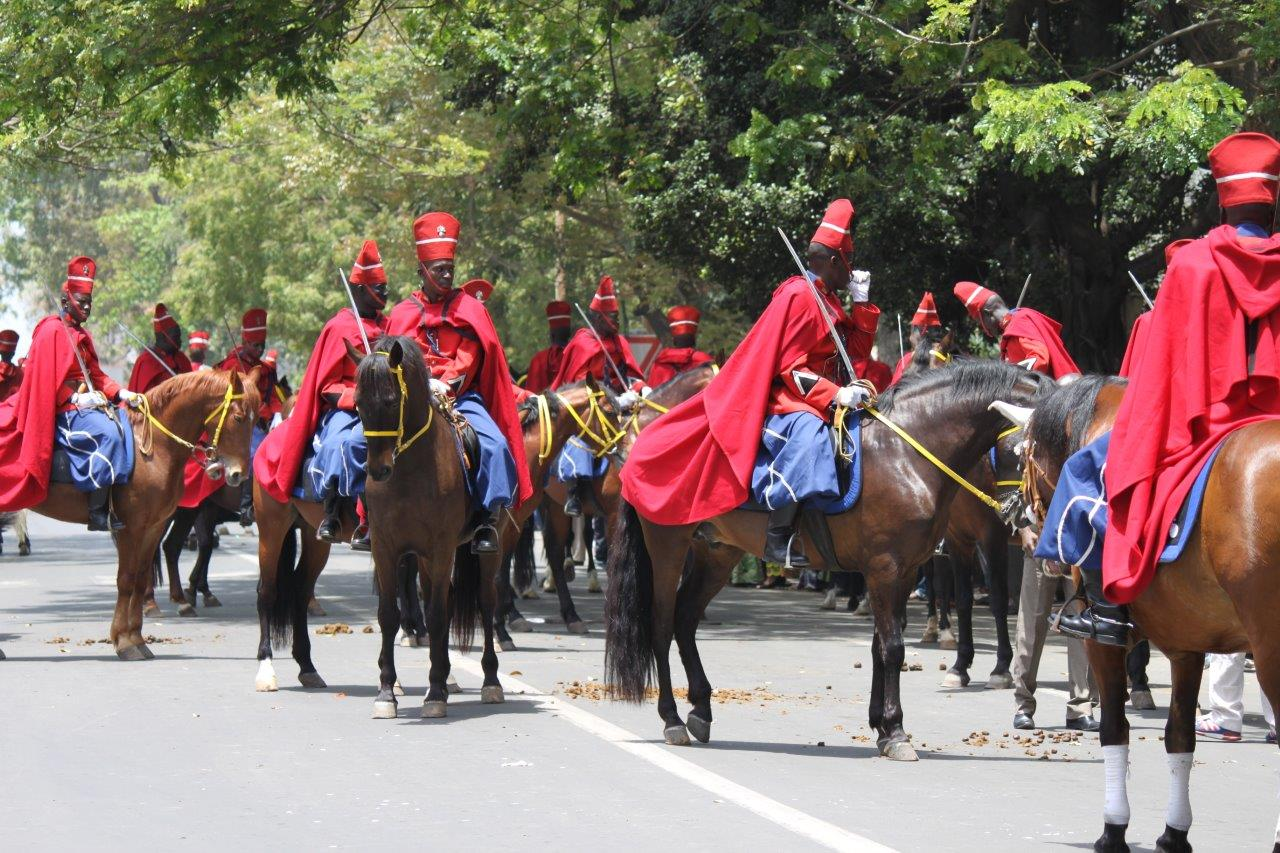
Red Guard of Senegal.

=== Territorial Gendarmerie ===
In terms of organization, it is made up of six territorial legions:

- Dakar
- Kaolack
- Saint-Louis
- Tambacounda
- Thiès
- Ziguinchor

Alongside one none-territorial legion, three mobile legions, and various specialized units (a research section, an environment section, a canine group and a GIGN).

=== Ranks ===
Officers

Rank group	General / flag officers			Senior officers			Junior officers
Senegalese Gendarmerie
Senegalese Gendarmerie	Général de corps d'armée	Général de division	Général de brigade	Colonel	Lieutenant-colonel	Commandant	Capitaine	Lieutenant	Sous-lieutenant

Enlisted

Rank group	Senior NCOs					Junior NCOs	Enlisted
Senegalese Gendarmerie
Senegalese Gendarmerie	Adjutant-major	Adjutant-chef	Adjutant	Maréchal des logis-chef	Maréchal des logis		Gendarme

== High Commanders of the Gendarmeries ==
- Captain Ameth Fall (October 1962–June 1964)
- Commander Tamsir O Ba (June 1964–November 1965)
- Captain Alioune Badara Konté (November 1965–August 1968)
- Major General Jean Alfred Diallo (August 1968–June 1972)
- Colonel Wally Faye (June 1972–July 1973)
- Brigadier General Daouda Niang (July 1973–June 1977)
- Lieutenant General Waly Faye (April 1977–June 1990)
- Major General Francois Gomis (July 1990–September 1994)
- Brigadier General Mamadou Diop (October 1994–December 1998)
- Lieutenant General Pathé Seck (January 1998–July 2005)
- Lieutenant General Abdoulaye Fall (July 2005–December 2013)
- Lieutenant General Mamadou Guèye Faye (January 2014–November 2016)
- General of the Army Meïssa Niang (November 2016–July 27, 2018)
- Lieutenant General, Cheikh Sène (July 2018–November 15, 2019)
- Lieutenant General Jean Baptiste Tine (November 15, 2019–June 17, 2021)
- General of the Army Moussa Fall (June 17, 2021–Avril 2024)
- General de division Martin faye (25 Avril 2024-Present

== See also ==
- Law enforcement in Senegal
