= Tirailleurs malgaches =

Malagasy infantry

The tirailleurs malgaches were a corps of French colonial infantry established in Madagascar.

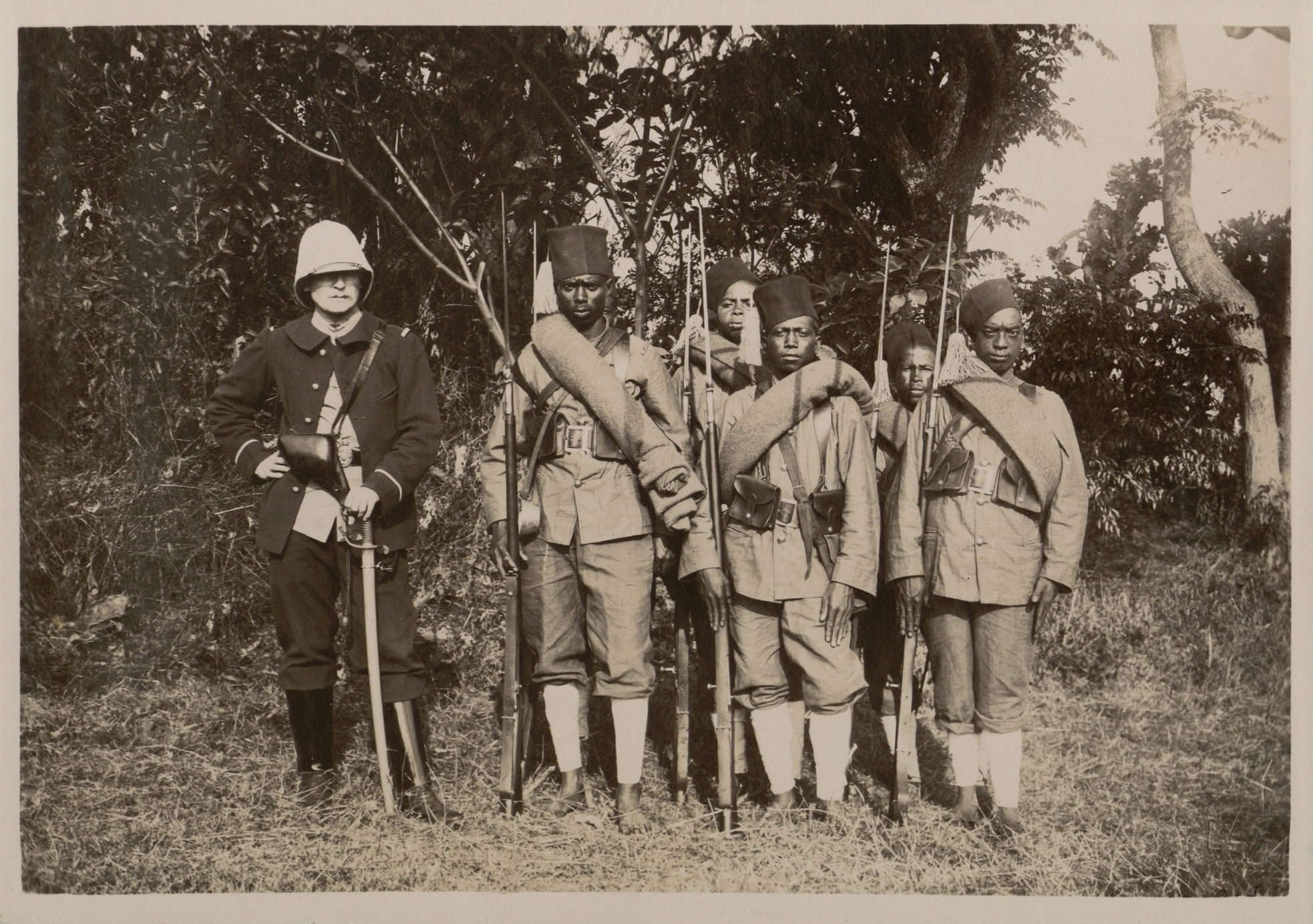
Tirailleurs malgaches with a French officer circa 1900.

== Overview ==
After the annexation of Madagascar by France in 1896, Malagasy troops were recruited, and the Tirailleurs malgaches were formed along similar lines to the Senegalese Tirailleurs, forming part of the Troupes coloniales of the French Armed Forces. In 1905, there were three regiments, each of three battalions apiece, stationed at Tananarive, Tamatave and Diego Suarez.

== World War I ==
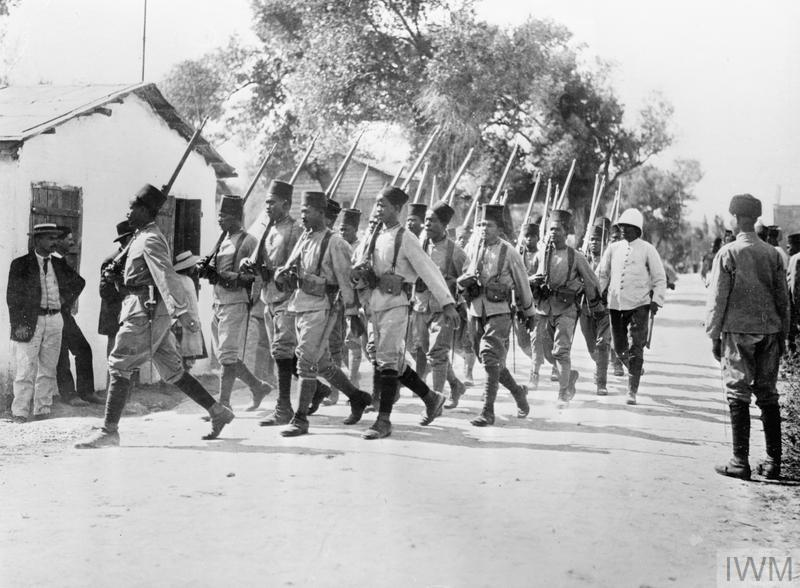
French colonial troops from Madagascar on the march, October 1917.

During World War I, the governor general of the colony, Hubert Garbit, organised the mobilisation of the Malagasy population. A first contingent of Tirailleurs malgaches was sent to France in October 1915, followed by five others in 1916. Like their Tirailleurs indochinois counterparts from French Indochina, the Tirailleurs malgaches battalions were initially employed behind the lines in guard, depot and factory-worker duties, rather than being deployed in a fighting role. A total of 26 battalions were formed between 1916 and 1918. These were garrisoned mainly at the camps of Fréjus and Puget-sur-Argens in the Var, and most were dissolved in 1918, with around 15,000 men being transferred to the artillery. Three battalions performed rear echelon duties with the Armée d'Orient (1915–1919) on the Macedonian front. (Note: Colonel Michaud, Staff Officer of the Allied Army of the Orient notes the 1st, and 4th Battalions, with the 5th Battalion engaged on the railways.) The 12e bataillon de tirailleurs malgaches was the only battalion to be awarded the Fourragère of the Croix de guerre 1914–1918 (France) for three unit citations. Up until 22 July 1918, it formed part of the highly decorated 1st Moroccan Infantry Division.

Between 1914 and 1918, 45,863 Malagasys served in the ranks of the French Colonial Army (including 41,355 in combat roles). Of these 10,000 were incorporated into heavy artillery regiments. A total of 3,101 Malagasy soldiers were killed or reported missing and 1,835 injured.

== Post WWI ==
In 1926 the Malagasy units were redesignated as the 1st and 2nd regiments mixte de Madagascar. These in turn were disbanded in November 1942, following the British occupation of the island. Reformed in 1946, the RMM lost their specific Malagasy identity after 1957 when merged into the mainstream Troupes de Marine.

== Uniforms ==
Throughout their history the Tirailleurs malgaches wore the same dark blue or khaki uniforms as the Tirailleurs senegalais on which they were modelled. The only distinction was the substitution of the letters TM for TS on the collar patches.

== Bibliography ==
- Chartrand, René (2018). French Naval & Colonial Troops 1872–1914. Men-at-Arms. London: Osprey. ISBN 978-1-47-282619-0.
- Crocé, Eliane; et al. (1991) [1986]. Les Troupes de Marine 1622 - 1984 (in French). Limoges: Charles Lavauzelle. ISBN 978-2-7025-0316-4.
- Garbit, Hubert-Auguste (1919). L'effort de Madagascar pendant la guerre. Ministère des Colonies, Gouverneur général de Madagascar (in French). Paris: Augustin Challamel.
- Frémeaux, Jacques (2006). Les colonies dans la Grande Guerre: Combats et épreuves des peuples d'outre-mer (in French). Saint-Cloud (Hauts de Seine: Ed. 14-18. ISBN 978-2-9519539-7-0. OCLC 951649837.
- Jouineau, André (2009a) [2008]. Officiers et soldats de l'armée française Tome 1 : 1914 [Officers and Soldiers of the French Army Volume I: 1914]. Officers and Soldiers #11. Translated by McKay, Alan. Paris: Histoire & Collections. ISBN 978-2-35250-104-6.
- Léonard, Arnaud (21 May 2014). La Grande Île dans la Grande Guerre. L'expérience combattante des Malgaches (1914-1918). Travailleurs et soldats. Les hommes des colonies dans la Grande Guerre (in French). Paris: Lycée français de Tananarive, Madagascar.
- Lepetit, Vincent; Tournyol du Clos, Alain; Rinieri, Ilario; Cardot, Jean Charles Léonide Philippe; Druène, Bernard, eds. (1933). Les armées françaises dans la Grande guerre. Tome VIII. La campagne d'Orient (Dardanelles et Salonique) Deuxième Volume. (août 1916 jusqu'en avril 1918) [8,2]. Ministère De la Guerre, Etat-Major de l'Armée - Service Historique (in French). Paris: Imprimerie Nationale. OCLC 491775909.
- Les armées françaises dans la Grande guerre. Tome VIII. Deuxième volume. La campagne d'Orient, de l'intervention de la Roumanie aux préparatifs d'offensive de 1918 (août 1916 jusqu'en avril 1918). Annexes 2- 2e Volume [8,2,2]. Ministère De la Guerre, Etat-Major de l'Armée - Service Historique (in French). Paris: Imprimerie Nationale. 1932. FRBNF41052951.
- Razafindranaly, Jacques (2000). Les soldats de la Grande île : d'une guerre à l'autre, 1895-1918. Repères pour Madagascar et l'Océan indien (in French). Paris: L'Harmattan. ISBN 978-2-738-49281-4.
