= 9th Colonial Infantry Division =

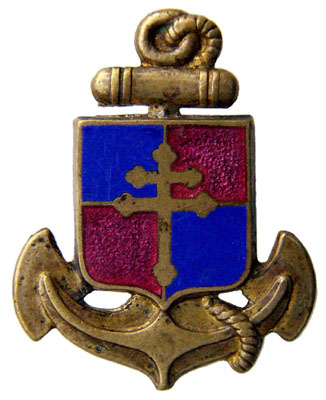
- Unit insignia
- Active: 16 July 1943 - November 1946
- Country: France
- Allegiance: France
- Branch: French Army
- Type: Infantry Division
- Role: Infantry
- Engagements: World War II; Invasion of Elba; Battle of Toulon (1944) Colmar Pocket

Commanders
- Notable commanders: Joseph Magnan; Jean Étienne Valluy

The 9th Colonial Infantry Division (French: 9e Division d'Infanterie Coloniale, 9e DIC) was a French Army formation which fought in World War II.

== History ==
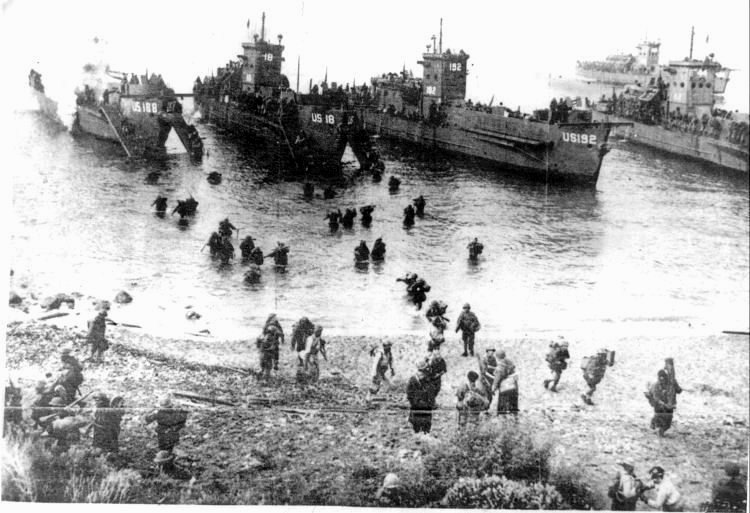
Troops from the 9th Colonial Division landing at Elba on 16 June 1944

A 9th Colonial Infantry Division was being formed in June 1940, but the formation wasn't finished when France surrendered after the Battle of France.

After the liberation of French North Africa, the division was created in July 1943 from Colonial units from French West Africa and Morocco. Many escapees from France who had reached North Africa via Spain joined the division. But at that time, the 9th DIC was mostly made up of Africans from all the territories of French West Africa.

The division saw its first action when it was tasked with the Invasion of Elba from Corsica on 17 June 1944. This was achieved in 4 days, in particular thanks to the actions of the 2nd battalion of the 13th regiment of Senegalese tirailleurs, commanded by Jean Gilles.

The 9th DIC became one of the components of General de Lattre de Tassigny's First French Army and in August 1944, it landed in Southern France. On 27 August 1944, the division liberated Toulon after heavy fighting.

The Division the took part in the Liberation of France advancing towards the Alsace. During this advance the Division was "whitened" (blanchiment), meaning that African soldiers were being replaced by French white volunteers.

In 1945, the division took part in the reduction of the Colmar Pocket in January and later in the invasion of Germany, taking Karlsruhe, Rastatt and Baden-Baden in April.

=== Composition (1943) ===
- 4th Senegalese Tirailleurs Regiment
- 6th Senegalese Tirailleurs Regiment
- 13th Senegalese Tirailleurs Regiment
- Régiment d'Infanterie Coloniale du Maroc (RICM)
- Régiment d'artillerie coloniale du Maroc
- Régiment colonial de chasseurs de chars
- 71e bataillon du génie
- 2e Groupe du Régiment d’Artillerie Coloniale d'Afrique occidentale (2e RAC-AOF)
- 3e Groupe du Régiment d’Artillerie Coloniale d’Afrique occidentale (3e RAC-AOF)
- 25e Bataillon Médical

=== Vietnam ===
In December 1945, the 9th DIC, under the command of General Valluy and part of the French Far East Expeditionary Corps, was sent to Indochina. Its task was to restore French rule in Indochina, which was under threat from the Viet Minh, which had declared Vietnam independent. The 9th DIC was disbanded on 1 November 1946, 6 weeks before the outbreak of the First Indochina War.

== Sources ==
- 9 éme D.I.C
- Le Blanchichement de la 9 ème D.I.C.
- Cavaliers Blindés
