= Battle of Toulon (1944) =

Battle fought during WWII

Coordinates: 43.1222°N 5.9300°E

- Part of Mediterranean and Middle East Theatre and the European Theatre of World War II
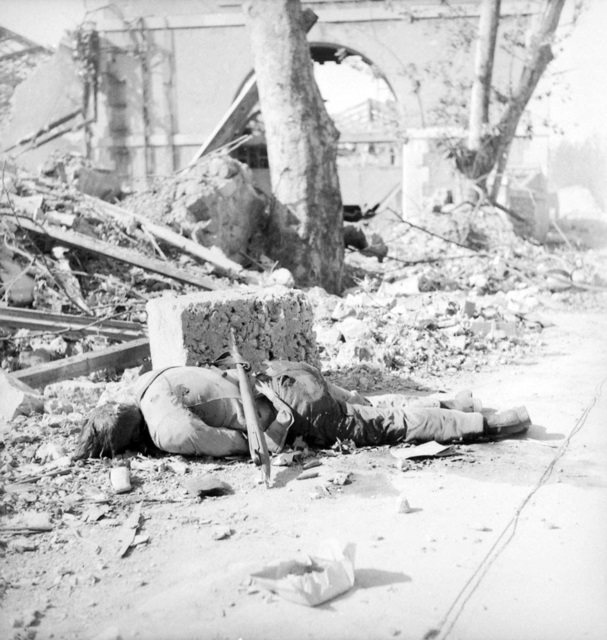
- Dead German soldier in Toulon harbour, photograph by Laurence Le Guay
| Date | 15–28 August 1944 |
| Location | Toulon, southern France |
| Result | Allied victory |

Belligerents
| France; United States | (Nazi Germany) Germany: Armenian Legion |

Commanders and leaders
| Edgard de Larminat | (Nazi Germany) Heinrich Ruhfus (Nazi Germany) Johannes Bäßler † |

Strength
| France: 52,000 men | 18,000 men (Note: 9,700 from Army, 5,500 from Air force and 2,800 Sailors) |

Casualties and losses
| 2,700 killed and wounded | 1,000 killed 17,000 captured |

The Battle of Toulon was an urban battle of World War II in southern France that took place 20–26 August 1944 and led to the liberation of Toulon by Free French forces under the command of General Edgard de Larminat.

== Background ==
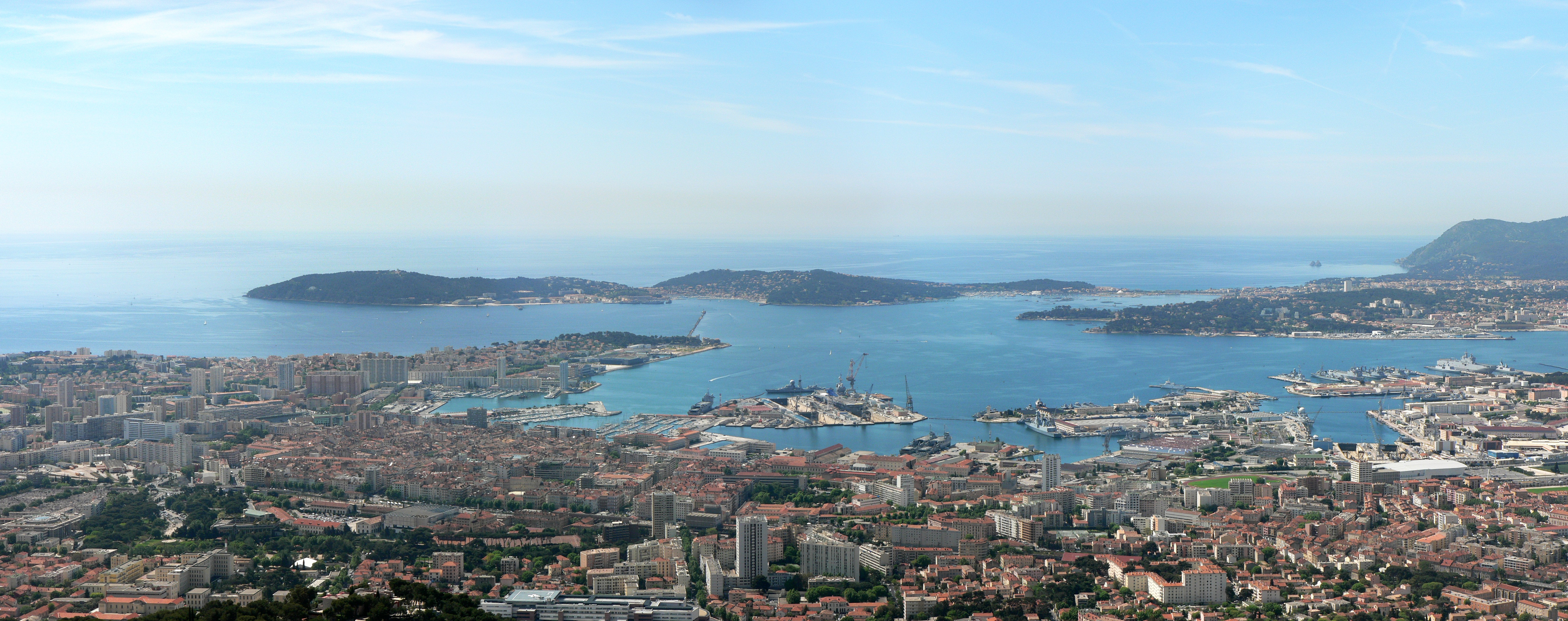
View of downtown Toulon and Mediterranean Sea from Mount Faron

Toulon was the main port for the French Navy (French: Marine nationale, "national navy"), informally "La Royale". On 27 November 1942, German troops had attacked the port, with the intention of seizing the French fleet, the subsequent fight lasted just long enough to scuttle the 75 warships, the pride of France.

After the successful execution of Operation Overlord, the Normandy landings, attention shifted to the south. Most ports in the north were unusable, or too heavily fortified (e.g. Cherbourg, Brest, Lorient, Saint Nazaire), which made seizure and control of the French ports at Marseille and Toulon increasingly attractive. The French leaders pressed for an invasion in southern France, too. Finally, after many delays, on 14 July, Operation Dragoon was authorized by the Allied Combined Chiefs of Staff.

Toulon was not a good target for an amphibious assault. It was well defended from a seaborne assault, so it would have to be taken from the land. The land approaches were also defended. A 700m high hill provided excellent artillery and observation positions. Ridges nearby were protected by French pillboxes. In 1941–2, as a token of goodwill to the Germans, the Government of Vichy France strengthened the defences. These defences were strengthened further by the Germans who took equipment off the scuttled French fleet ships, installing two 340mm turrets and 75 medium-sized guns along the coast.

On 13 August as part of Operation Nutmeg, the 17th Bombardment Group attacked Toulon Harbour twice, with Martin B-26 Marauder aircraft, experiencing heavy anti aircraft fire.

The groundwork was laid by the Allied invasion of southern France in Operation Dragoon on 15 August by the United States Seventh Army under General Patch, with support from the French First Army. Patch gave the order to General Jean de Lattre de Tassigny to take the cities of Toulon and Marseille, which were to be attacked simultaneously with de Larminat in charge of attacking Toulon.

== 15 August-13 September 1944 ==
The German troops around Toulon were the 242nd Infantry Division (Wehrmacht) who set up a defensive line east of Toulon.Under Hitler's orders, they were to defend Toulon to the last man and, if defeat was inevitable, destroy the harbour.

The German troops took the opportunity to try to scuttle the remaining ships in Toulon harbour, including the battleship Strasbourg and the cruiser La Galissonnière, both which had been refloated, with the plan to block the southern channel, but American bombers sank them first.

On 16 August the 17th Bombardment Group returned with the object of destroying the heavy guns. This was not a task appreciated by the crews, who had experienced the very heavy flak already. There would be a total of 28 raids against the submarine pens and artillery batteries, in which eight B-26 were lost and 125 damaged. The result was five dents to the defensive batteries.

The 242nd Division was involved in fighting against the left wing of the Allied force, until on 18 August the remnants retired into Toulon.

The original plan for the capture of Toulon was for the 3rd Algerian Infantry Division to attack from the north followed by the 9th Colonial Infantry Division. There would be distraction and flanking protection provided by other units. The attack to be made on 24 August.

Given the success of the Allied invasion, de Lattre decided to move ahead with the liberation of Toulon rather than wait for the second wave of Allied landings and started the move on 18 August with the troops that were available. Sixteen thousand fighters went into battle with thirty tanks and a few artillery batteries.

The mission was given to the 3 Algerian in the north, and the 1st Free French Division in the south with support from the 1st Armored Division and the 2nd Algerian Spahi regiment (Note: Spahis were light former cavalry regiments of the French army recruited primarily from the indigenous populations of northern Africa.). The center was given to the 9th Colonial Infantry Division. Larminat was in command of 52,000 troops of the 2nd Army Corps, chiefly from the 1st Free French Division and the 9th CID.

On 20 August 3 Algerian reached the suburbs at Mont Faron and on the 21st Toulon was surrounded. That evening 3 Algerian moved into the town streets. To the east, German troops used old French tanks in their defence. It took time, but by 23 August French troops were everywhere in the city, raising the tricolour and there was a steady stream of prisoners. During the 24th the last German defences were taken together with 1,000 prisoners.

The Naval base was now attacked. Heavy fighting and artillery barrages began to tell with first one fort then others surrendering. A victory parade was held on the 27th to the sound of German artillery guns still firing on the attackers, including the 340mm guns. Attempts by the Germans to flee by sea on August 27 were met by American ships. One vessel escaped, another was captured, and the remaining four were sunk.

At 2245 the German commander, Admiral Ruhfus agreed to an unconditional surrender. The garrison of 1,880 marched out next day. None of the German positions had shown the level of fanaticism that Hitler demanded, and by September 13 the harbour was repaired well enough to receive ships.

== Aftermath ==
The nine-day battle had cost 2,700 casualties for which they had taken 17,000 prisoners and captured the vast naval base.

The liberation of the city of Marseille, which was running in parallel with the fighting in Toulon was achieved when the Germans surrendered on 28 August. The Battle of Provence was won more than 60 days ahead of schedule.

After the war, General Charles de Gaulle claimed that the battle for France was also the battle of Frenchmen for France and it was he who ensured that de Lattre and Leclerc had been in defining moments in the Liberation of France. They had driven into Marseille, Paris and Toulon.

Today the Naval Base is the main home of the French Navy, including the aircraft carrier Charles de Gaulle, the flagship of the fleet.

== See also ==
- French Forces of the Interior
- Nazi Germany
- Zone libre

== Bibliography ==
- Gaujac, Paul (1985). L'Armée de la victoire [The Army of Victory]. Les Grandes batailles de France (in French). Vol. 3 De la Provence à l'Alsace. Paris: Charles-Lavauzelle. pp. 124–137. ISBN 978-2-702-50126-9. OCLC 461876740..
- Jean de Lattre de Tassigny (1949). Histoire de la première armée française [History of the First French Army] (in French). Plon.
- François de Linares (2005). Par les portes du Nord : la libération de Toulon et Marseille en 1944 [By the Northern Ports: the Liberation of Toulon and Marseille in 1944] (in French). Paris: Nouvelles éditions latines. ISBN 978-2-723-32056-6. OCLC 62176140.
