= Mamadou Sow =

Senegalese general

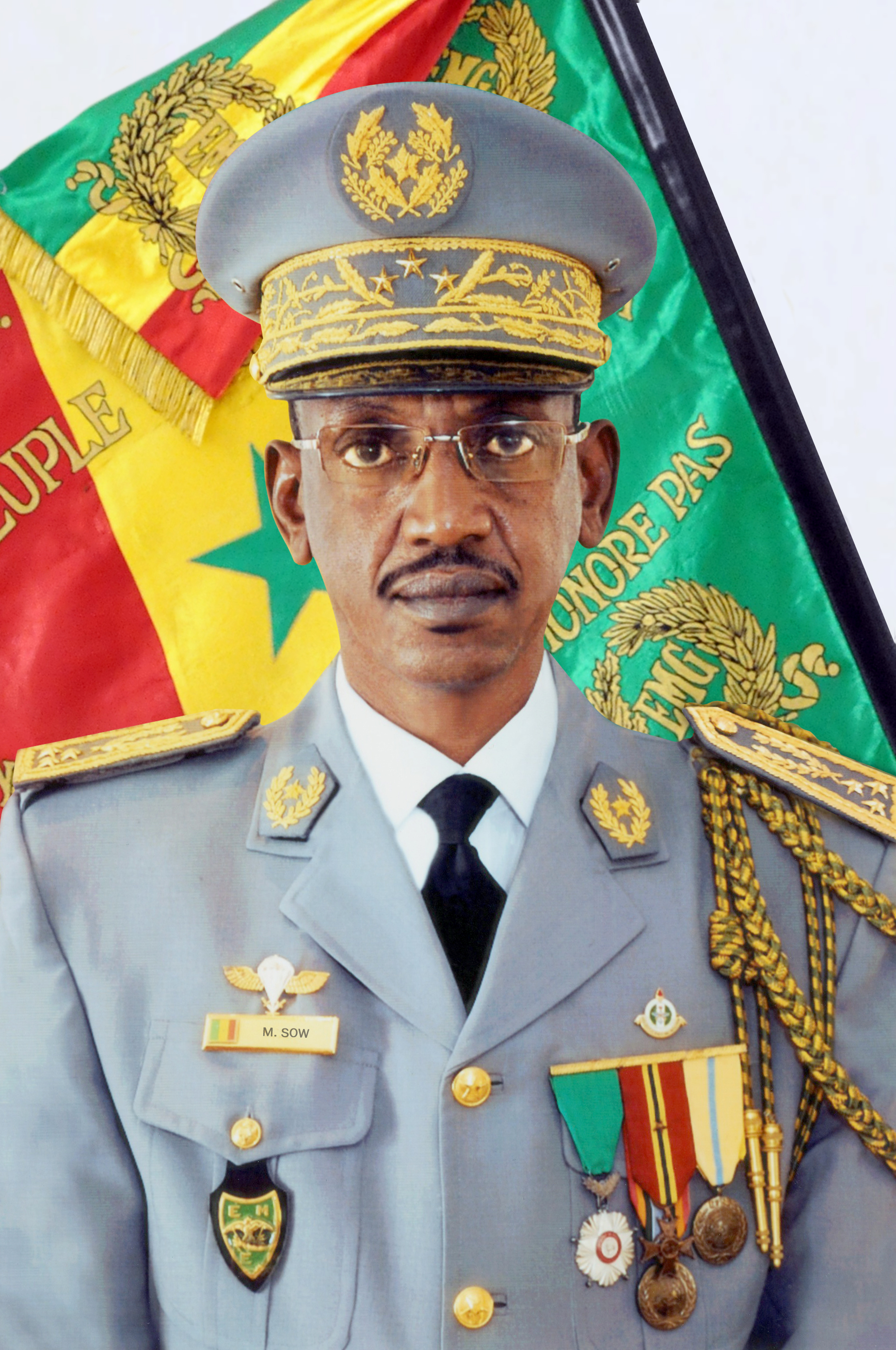
- Born: 1956 (age 69–70)
- Allegiance: Armed Forces of Senegal
- Service years: 1977–2017
- Rank: Army general (France)
- Awards: Croix de la Valeur Militaire
- Alma mater: École de cavalerie, Saumur; École nationale des officiers d’active École supérieure de Guerre Terre

Mamadou Sow (born 1956) is a Senegalese General. He was the Chief of the General Staff in the Senegalese Military, from October 29, 2012, to December 31, 2016. He was a Divisional general since July 2, 2012. He was the first Chief of the General Staff to come from the École nationale des officiers d’active (ENOA).

== Education ==
General Mamadou Sow has a Baccalaureate degree – DUEL 1 im History. Entering the service in 1977 at the École nationale des sous-Officiers d’Active, he was then admitted into the École nationale des Officiers d’Active (ENOA) in Thiès, created July 8, 1981, from which he graduated as a major. At this time, the school was led by the first "Kélétigui" (school commandant) Mouhamadou Lamine Keita and Babacar Gaye was the promotion Director.

Graduating as a Lieutenant, he took the Junior officer development program at the École d'application de l'arme blindée cavalerie of Saumur. He then became a trainee at the ABC Captain's Course, in the U.S., and got a certificate for a General Staff course taken there. He received credit from the École supérieure de Guerre Terre in Nigéria.

== United Nations ==
From 16/09/1993 to 15/10/1994, he was a United Nations Observer in the United Nations Observer Mission Uganda–Rwanda in Uganda (UNOMUR). From 01/07/2002 to 01/09/2003, he was a United Nations Observer in the United Nations Iraq–Kuwait Observation Mission between Iraq and Kuwait (UNIKOM). He was Section Commander No. 2 in the Congo in the United Nations Organization Stabilization Mission in the Democratic Republic of the Congo (MONUSCO). He was Force Chief of Staff of the United Nations–African Union Mission in Darfur, (UNAMID) He was considered for the position of joint-commander of the United Nations Organisation Mission in the Democratic Republic of the Congo (MONUSCO).

== Other experience ==
He participated in a seminar "Netherlands Defense Orientations Courses" in the Netherlands. He also participated in the training mission of the 1st Senegalese Battalion of the African Crisis Response Initiative force. After retiring from the Army, he became Senegal's ambassador to Spain.

== Decorations and awards ==
Mamadou Sow has received the following decorations:

=== Senegalese decorations ===
- Senegalese: – Cross of Military Valour (Croix de la Valeur Militaire)

=== Commemorative Medals ===
- U.N. Medals
  - (Uganda – UNOMER)
  - (Democratic Republic of the Congo – MONUSCO)
  - (Sudan – UNAMID)
  - (Kuwait – UNIKOM)
  - (Angola – UNAVEM)

=== Controversies ===
He has been suspected of possible corruption after refusing to report his financial assets.

== See also ==
- Armed Forces of Senegal

Military offices
| Preceded by Abdoulaye Fall | Chief of the General Staff (Senegal); 2012–2016 | Succeeded by Cheikh Gueye |
Diplomatic posts
| Preceded by Abdou Salam Diallo | Senegal Ambassador to Spain; 2017 | Succeeded by |
