= Military ranks of Senegal =

The Military ranks of Senegal (French: Grades militaires du Sénégal) are the military insignia used by the Armed Forces of Senegal. Being a former colony of France, Senegal shares a rank structure similar to that of France.

== Commissioned officer ranks ==
The rank insignia of commissioned officers.

| Rank group | General / flag officers | | | Senior officers | | | Junior officers |
|---|---|---|---|---|---|---|---|---|---|
| Senegalese Army |
| Senegalese Army | Général de corps d'armée | Général de division | Général de brigade | Colonel | Lieutenant-colonel | Commandant | Capitaine | Lieutenant | Sous-lieutenant |
| Senegalese Navy |
| Senegalese Navy | | | Contre-amiral | Capitaine de vaisseau | Capitaine de frégate | Capitaine de corvette | Lieutenant de vaisseau | Enseigne de vaisseau de 1^{re} classe | Enseigne de vaisseau de 2^{e} classe |
| Senegalese Air Force |
| Senegalese Air Force | | Général de division | Général de brigade | Colonel | Lieutenant-colonel | Commandant | Capitaine | Lieutenant | Sous-lieutenant |
| Senegalese Gendarmerie |
| Senegalese Gendarmerie | Général de corps d'armée | Général de division | Général de brigade | Colonel | Lieutenant-colonel | Commandant | Capitaine | Lieutenant | Sous-lieutenant |
| Rank group | General / flag officers | | | Senior officers | | | Junior officers |

== Other ranks ==
The rank insignia of non-commissioned officers and enlisted personnel.

| Rank group | Senior NCOs | | | | | Junior NCOs | | Enlisted |
|---|---|---|---|---|---|---|---|---|---|
| Senegalese Army | | | | | | | | | No insignia |
| Senegalese Army | Adjudant-chef | | Adjudant | Sergent-chef | Sergent | Caporal-chef | Caporal | Soldat de première classe | Soldat |
| Senegalese Navy | | | | | | | | | No insignia |
| Senegalese Navy | Maitre-principal | | Premier maitre | Maitre | Second maitre | Quartier-maitre se 1ere classe | Quartier-maitre se 2eme classe | Matelot brevet | Matelot |
| Senegalese Air Force | | | | | | | | | No insignia |
| Senegalese Air Force | Adjudant-chef | | Adjudant | Sergent-chef | Sergent | Caporal-chef | Caporal | Soldat de première classe | Soldat |
| Senegalese Gendarmerie |
| Senegalese Gendarmerie | Adjutant-major | Adjutant-chef | Adjutant | Maréchal des logis-chef | Maréchal des logis | | | Gendarme |
| Rank group | Senior NCOs | | | | | Junior NCOs | | Enlisted |
