= Chief of the General Staff (Senegal) =

Head of the armed forces of Senegal

- Chefs d'État-Major général des armées
- Incumbent; Oumar Wade since 12 February 2026
- Armed Forces of Senegal
- Style: Sir
- Reports to: Minister of Defense
- Residence: Dakar
- Seat: Dakar
- Appointer: President of Senegal
- Term length: No fixed length
- Constituting instrument: Constitution of Senegal
- Precursor: Chief of Staff of the Federation of Mali
- Formation: 1960
- First holder: Amadou Fall
- Website: Official website

The Chief of the Defense Staff (French: Chefs d'État-Major général des armées) is the professional head of the Armed Forces of Senegal. They are responsible for the administration and the operational control of the military of Senegal. The current chief is Vice Admiral Oumar Wade.

== Duties ==
They are responsible for the preparation of military plans and operations:

- General Staff
- Directorate of Military Security;
- Department of Information and Public Relations

They directly exercises their authority over:

- Chief of the Army Staff
- Chief of Staff of the Navy
- Chief of Staff of the Air Force
- Military zone commanders

The directors of the specialized services departments placed for employment with them are:

- Engineering Management
- Material Department (DIRMAT)
- Direction of Transmissions (DIRTRANS);
- Stewardship Department (DIRINT);
- Armed Forces Health Directorate (DSA)

== List ==
No.	Portrait	Name (Birth–Death)	Term of office			Ref.
No.	Portrait	Name (Birth–Death)	Took office	Left office	Time in office	Ref.
1		General; Amadou Fall	1960	1960	0 years	
2		Colonel; Abdoulaye Soumaré (1905–1964)	1960	19 August 1960	0 years	
3		Colonel; Idrissa Fall (born 1932)	20 August 1960	1962	1–2 years	
4		Major general Jean Alfred Diallo (1911–2006)	17 December 1962	30 June 1972	9 years, 196 days	
(3)		Colonel; Idrissa Fall (born 1932)	1 July 1972	30 June 1984	11 years, 365 days	
5		General; Joseph Louis Tavarez de Souza	1 July 1984	31 May 1988	3 years, 335 days	
6		General of air corps Mamadou Mansour Seck	31 May 1988	30 June 1993	5 years, 30 days	
7		General; Mouhamadou Lamine Keita	30 June 1993	30 June 1996	3 years	
8		General of the army Lamine Cissé (1939–2019)	1 July 1996	31 December 1997	1 year, 183 days	
9		Major general Mamadou Seck	1 January 1998	30 April 2000	2 years, 120 days	
10		Lieutenant general Babacar Gaye (born 1951)	1 May 2000	12 August 2003	3 years, 103 days	
11		Lieutenant general Papa Khalilou Fall (born 1947)	12 August 2003	31 May 2006	2 years, 292 days	
12		Lieutenant general Abdoulaye Fall (born 1952)	1 June 2006	30 October 2012	6 years, 151 days	
13		General; Mamadou Sow (born 1956)	30 October 2012	31 December 2016	4 years, 62 days	
14		General; Cheikh Gueye (born 1960)	1 January 2017	31 December 2019	3 years, 364 days	
15		General of air corps Birame Diop	1 January 2020	1 April 2021	1 year, 90 days	
16		Army corps general Cheikh Wade	1 April 2021	6 April 2023	2 years, 5 days	
17		General of air corps Mbaye Cissé	6 April 2023	12 February 2026	2 years, 312 days	
18		Vice admiral Oumar Wade	12 February 2026	Incumbent	226 days	
