= Senegalese Air Force =

Air warfare branch of Senegal's military

- Armée de l'Air Sénégalaise
- Senegalese Air Force badge
- Founded: 1 April 1961; 65 years ago
- Country: Senegal
- Type: Air force
- Role: Aerial warfare Airlift; Combat search and rescue Counterinsurgency; Force protection Forward air control Maritime patrol
- Size: 1,000 personnel; 40 aircraft (2025)
- Part of: Senegalese Armed Forces
- Headquarters: Ouakam

Commanders
- Current commander: Général Pape Souleymane Sarr

Insignia
- Roundel

Aircraft flown
- Attack: KAI KT-1 Woongbi
- Helicopter: Mil Mi-2, Mi-17, Eurocopter AS355, Bell 206, Aérospatiale Alouette III
- Attack helicopter: Mil Mi-35
- Patrol: CASA/IPTN CN-235
- Trainer: Aerospatiale Epsilon, KAI KT-1 Woongbi
- Transport: Fokker 27, CASA/IPTN CN-235

The Senegalese Air Force (French: Armée de l'Air Sénégalaise) is the air force branch of the Senegalese Armed Forces.

== History ==
It was formed on 1 April 1961 with Douglas C-47s, MH.1521 Broussards, plus Sud Alouette II and Agusta-Bell 47G helicopters. Close ties to France have been maintained with France through training and base facilities agreements.

The early 1970s saw further French deliveries, with the first jet aircraft entering service. The Fouga Magister jet trainer/ground attack aircraft as well as an SA 341H Gazelle and SA 330F Puma helicopters were delivered. During the 1981 Gambian coup d'état attempt one of the SA 330Fs was shot down attempting to recapture the Radio Syd transmitter outside Banjul, killing all 18 onboard.

Later expansion saw the delivery of six Fokker F27 transports to replace the C-47s from 1977, when also four SOCATA Rallye light planes were acquired. Four armed Rallye 235A Guerrier version followed in 1984.

Senegal ordered 4 Aero L-39NGs for both light attack / COIN and training duties in April 2018. By March 2022 it was reported that Senegal had cancelled the order.

== Organization ==
The Air Force's headquarters are currently located at Ouakam, near the capital of Dakar, on the opposite side of the Léopold Sédar Senghor International Airport. The air force has the role of defending Senegalese airspace, protecting airport areas, supporting other Senegalese forces, medevac and maritime patrol.

Funding remains a constant problem for the Senegalese Air Force and the increasing cost of aviation fuel restricts the number of available flying hours.

== Air Force Chiefs of Staff ==
- General Pape Souleymane Sarr
- General Birame Diop
- General Ousmane Kane
- General Alain JC Pereira
- Captain Mamadou Mansour Seck
- Commander Amadou Lam
- Colonel Mamadou Diop
- Colonel Sidy Ndiaye Bouya
- Colonel Raoul Dacosta
- Colonel Amadou Fall
- Colonel Tamba Meissa
- Colonel Mouhamadou Diawara

== Aircraft ==
=== Current inventory ===
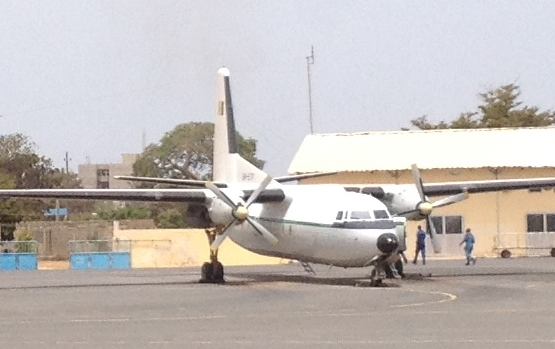
A Senegalese Fokker 27

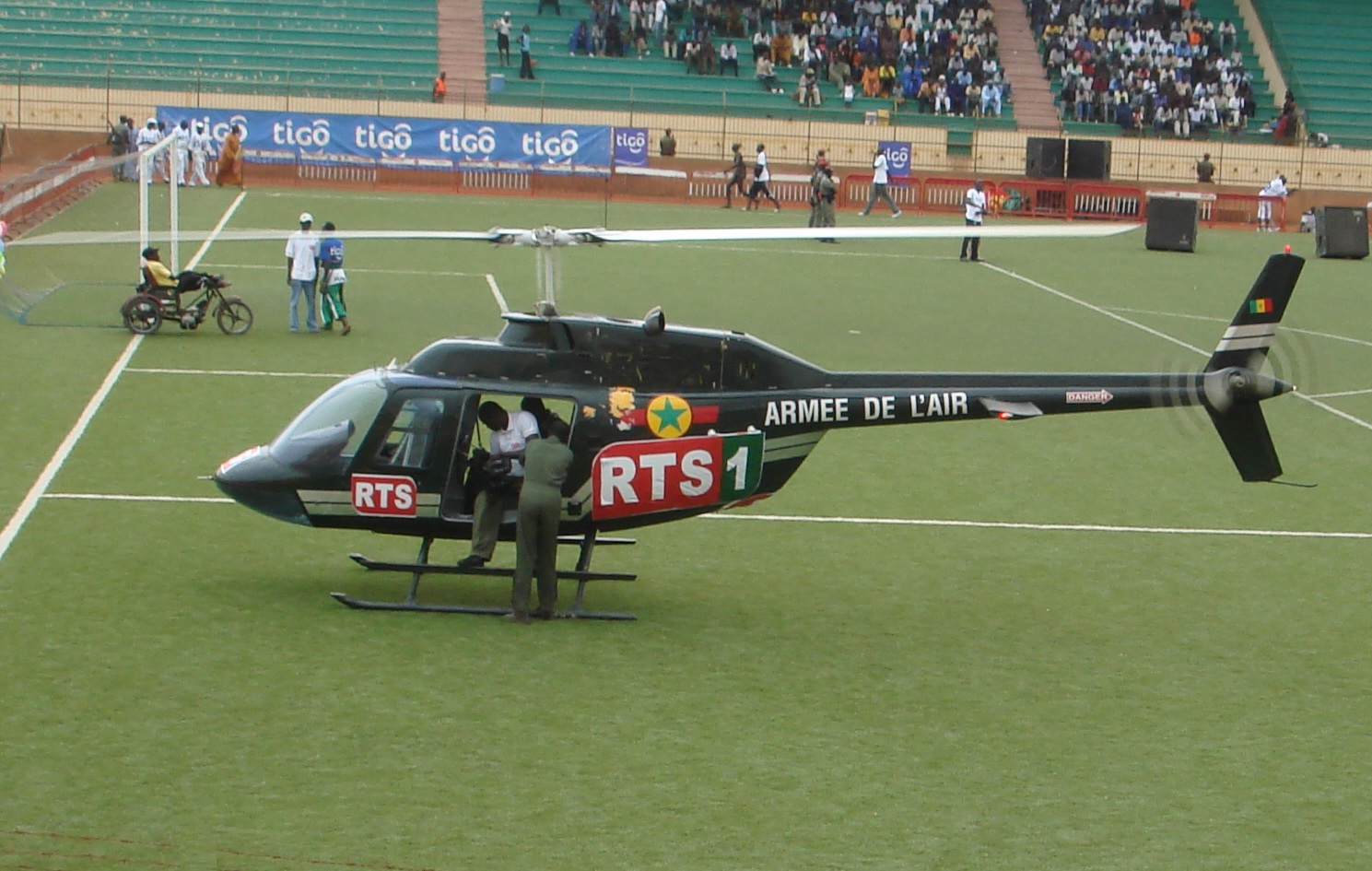
A Senegalese Bell 206

Aircraft	Origin	Type	Variant	In service	Notes
Maritime patrol
IPTN CN-235	Indonesia	Maritime patrol		1	
Transport
IPTN CN-235	Indonesia	Transport		2	
EADS CASA C-295	Spain	Transport		1	
Beechcraft Super King Air	United States	Transport	King Air 200	2	
Helicopters
Bell 206	United States	Utility		1	
Mil Mi-17	Russia	Utility		4	
Mil Mi-24	Russia	Attack	Mi-35	5	
Aérospatiale Alouette III	France	Liaison / Utility		1	
Bell 505	United States / Canada	Utility		3	
Trainer aircraft
Socata TB 30	France	Basic trainer		6	
KAI KT-1 Woongbi	South Korea	Primary trainer		4	
Hughes 269	United States	Trainer helicopter		6	
