= KAI KT-1 Woongbi =

South Korean military training aircraft

KT-1 Woongbi
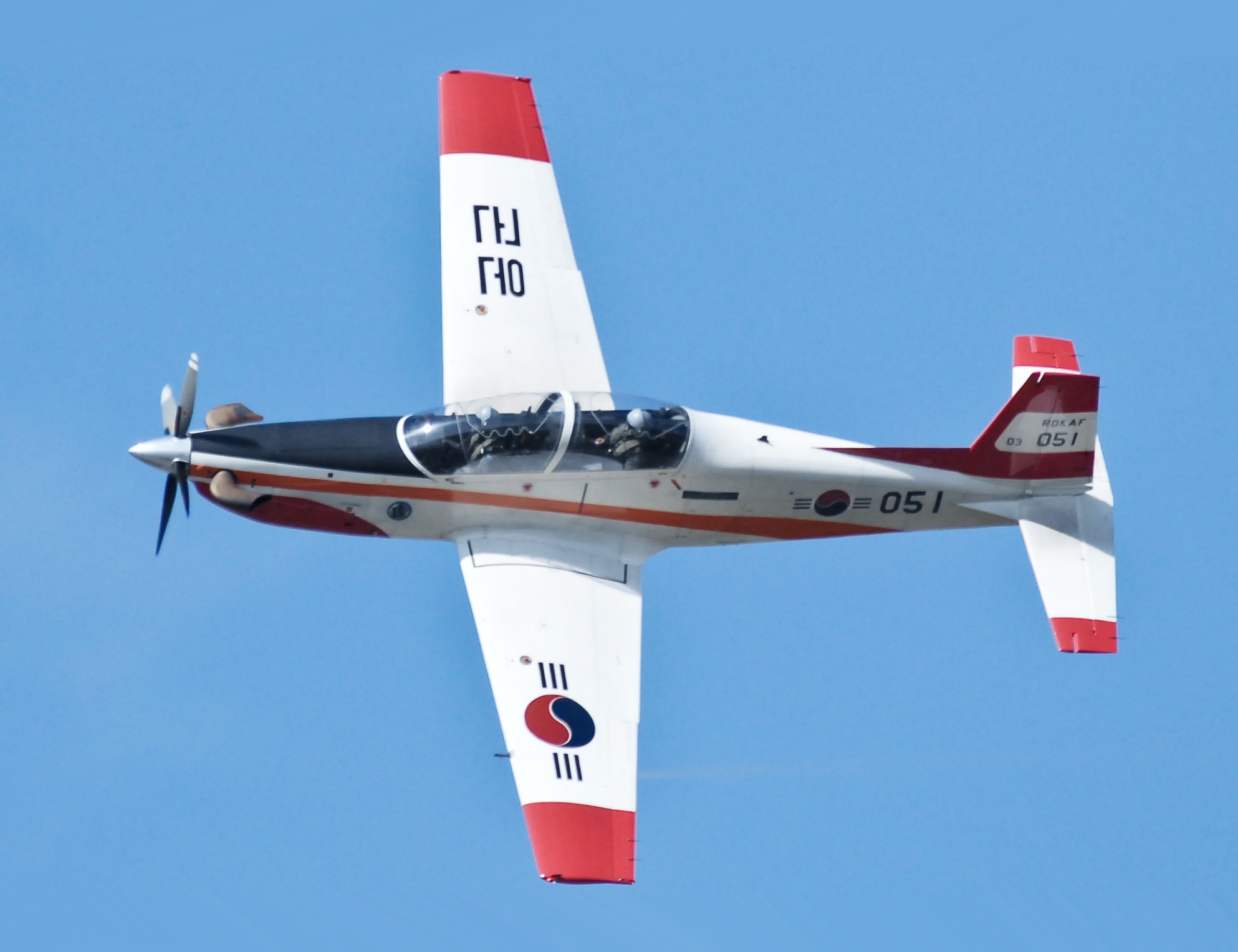
- KT-1 during a demonstration

General information
- Type: Basic trainer and light attack aircraft
- National origin: South Korea
- Manufacturer: Korea Aerospace Industries
- Designer: Agency for Defence Development; Korea Aerospace Industries
- Status: In service
- Primary users: Republic of Korea Air Force: Indonesian Air Force; Turkish Air Force; Peruvian Air Force; Senegalese Air Force
- Number built: 186

History
- Manufactured: 1999–present
- Introduction date: 2000
- First flight: November 1991

The KAI KT-1 Woongbi (Hangul: KT-1 웅비) is a South Korean single-engined turboprop, basic training aircraft. It was jointly developed by Korea Aerospace Industries (KAI) and the Agency for Defense Development (ADD).

== Development ==
=== Origins ===
The origins of the KT-1 were in the KTX programme, which had been launched during 1988 on behalf of the Republic of Korea Air Force (ROKAF). The programme, which sought to develop an indigenously designed trainer aircraft, was a joint effort between aircraft manufacturer Korea Aerospace Industries (KAI) and government body Agency for Defence Development (ADD); the latter was responsible for overseeing the project, while the former performed the detailed design work as well as the majority of manufacturing activity.

A series of nine prototypes were constructed, the first being complete during June 1991. During 1995, the aircraft was officially named 'Woongbi'. In 1998, it was announced that the final test flight had been performed.

=== Further development ===
During 2002, KAI revealed that they were working on the production of an upgraded and armed version of the KT-1 basic trainer. This variant, designated KO-1, was intended to be used in the forward air control and counter-insurgency (COIN) roles. Development was conducted in cooperation with the Agency for Defence Development (ADD) and had been undertaken in response to an existing RKAF requirement for 20-40 aircraft. According to a KAI representative, the KO-1 is ideally suited for drug interdiction operations and that the company was pitching the variant towards countries in Latin America.

On 8 March 2006, a KAI spokesperson announced that the company intended to export more than 150 improved versions of the KT-1 to various countries across both Central America and Southeast Asia. During 2005, KAI had begun marketing the KT-1 as one element of an integrated training package, having paired it with their newer jet-powered KAI T-50 Golden Eagle trainer. The company also stated that it believes a partnership with American aerospace company Lockheed Martin shall encourage confidence in its training platforms.

In June 2025, KAI has proposed to set up KT-1 production lines in Indonesia. On 20 October 2025, KAI and Indonesian Aerospace (PT DI) signed a framework agreement on KT-1 development program. Indonesian Aerospace representative stated that the agreement served as the first step on KT-1 joint production, as the KT-1 production lines would be gradually transferred to the Indonesian Aerospace facility in Bandung. Indonesian Aerospace would also serve the maintenance of KT-1.

== Design ==
The KT-1 can be equipped with either an analog or 'glass' cockpit configuration. Some variants feature additional avionics and systems, such as a night vision goggles (NVG)-compatible cockpit, head-up display (HUD), multi-function displays (MFD), GPS/inertial navigation system, mission computer, onboard oxygen generation system, a vapour-cycle environmental control system and hands-on-throttle-and-stick (HOTAS)-compatible controls. Avionics are provided by various foreign companies, including Elbit, Flight Vision and Thales.

For light attack missions, the aircraft can carry various types of guns, bombs, rockets and missiles dependent upon customer requirements. Other equipment can include external fuel tanks, a centrally mounted forward-looking infrared (FLIR) sensor and a laser range finder.

== Operational history ==
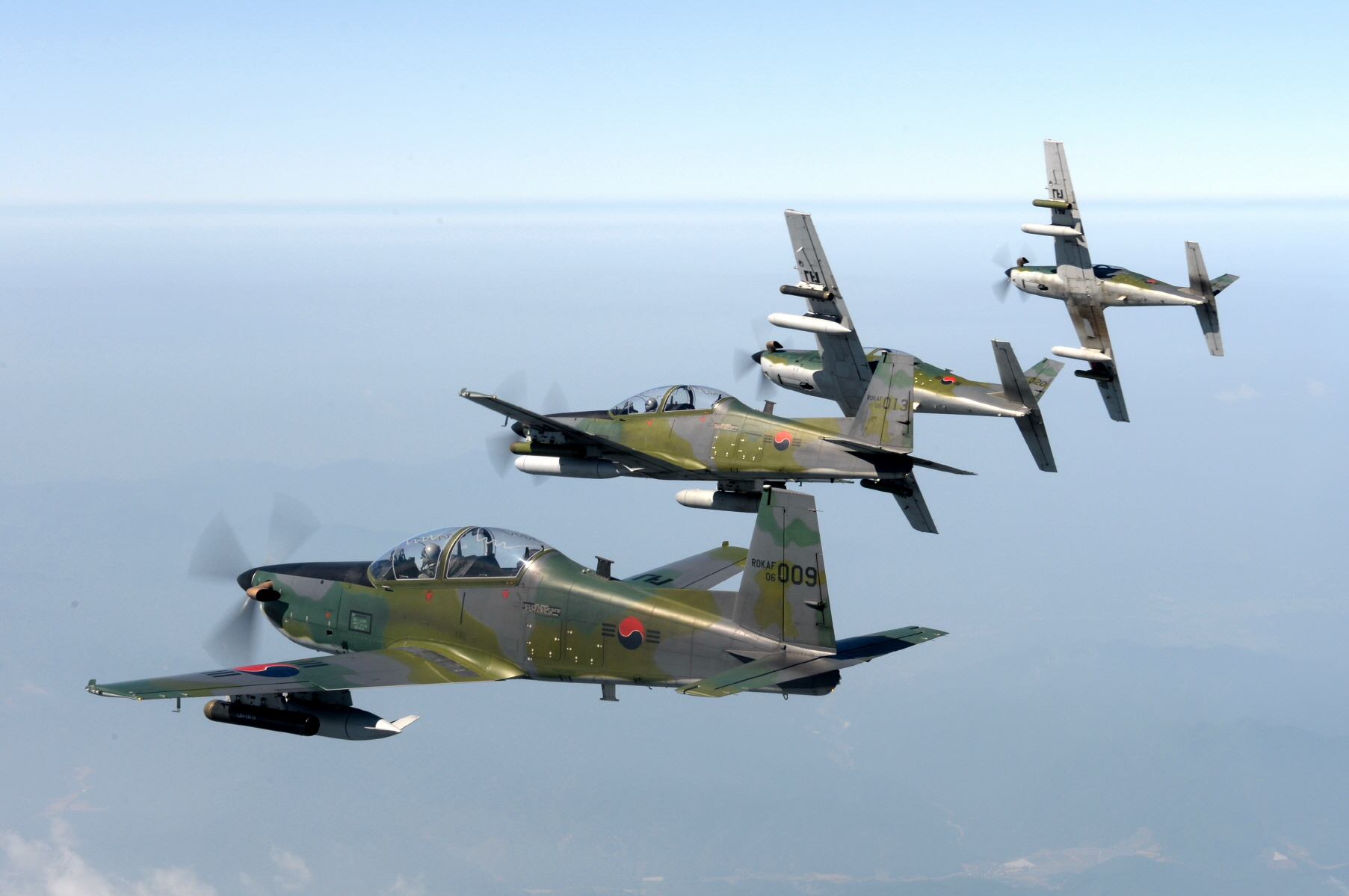
ROKAF 8th Fighter Wing KA-1

The Republic of Korea Air Force (ROKAF) is the primary customer for the type. During 2000, the first KT-1 Woongbi was handed over to the ROKAF; deliveries had originally been scheduled to commence two years earlier. By the end of that year, eight aircraft had been delivered to the service; reportedly, a rate of production of two aircraft per month had been achieved by this point. By November 2003, the assembly line was reportedly about to be put on hold following the completion of the ROKAF's order; however, KAI aimed to restart production within two-three years based upon follow-on orders. However, a follow-on ROKAF order for 20 aircraft was received that same month. The majority of the ROKAF's fleet can be armed with both gun pods and rockets, which are intended to be used for weapons training.

One of the first export customers for the KT-1 was Indonesia. During early 2001, Indonesia exchanged 8 CASA/IPTN CN-235 transport aircraft for 12 KT-1 trainers. On 25 April 2003, the first KT-1 was delivered to Indonesia, a move which represented the first Korean aircraft export; commenting at the time, KAI stated that it was presently in negotiations for a 13-trainer follow-on order. During early 2011, reported emerged that Indonesia was interested in further acquisitions, but South Korean officials denied that any further barter deals had been agreed. During November 2018, three additional KT-1B aircraft were ordered for the Indonesian Air Force (IDAF).

In addition to its use as a basic trainer, the Indonesian Air Force have equipped their Jupiter Aerobatic Team with the KT-1. On 15 March 2015, a serious midair collision occurred during a practice session for Malaysia's Langkawi International Maritime and Aerospace Exhibition. Initial reports stated that all four pilots survived the collision.

During June 2007, South Korea and Turkey successfully negotiated a ₩500 billion (equivalent to ₩747.38 billion or US$557.63 million in 2025) contract for 40 (+15) KT-1s; this exchange involved the modular armor technology of the K2 Black Panther main battle tank (MBT), which Turkey hopes to use upon its own future indigenous Atlay MBT. The last of these aircraft, which were designated KT-1T and jointly manufactured by the two nations, was delivered during late 2012. During April 2015, it was announced that Turkey would procure a further 15 KT-1Ts as a stop-gap measure until development of its indigenous TAI Hürkuş trainer aircraft could be completed.

On 6 November 2012, KAI and the Peruvian Air Force signed a contract for 20 KT-1Ps, comprising ten KT and ten KA versions as well as some offset and technology transfer arrangements, for an approximate amount of US$208 million. KAI was to provide the first four aircraft by the end of 2014, while the remainder were to be locally assembled by SEMAN, the maintenance air wing of the Peruvian Air Force. The type shall progressively replace the aging fleets of Aermacchi MB-339 and Embraer EMB 312 Tucano aircraft. During April 2015, the first locally manufactured KT-1P was delivered to the Peruvian Air Force.

During November 2018, Spain proposed a barter deal to South Korea's Defense Acquisition Program Administration (DAPA) involving the KT-1 and other Korean aircraft, potentially involving up to 30 planes, which Spain wished to exchange for up to 6 Airbus A400M Atlas transport planes. If completed, this deal would be first export of the KT-1 to a European Union country.

== Variants ==
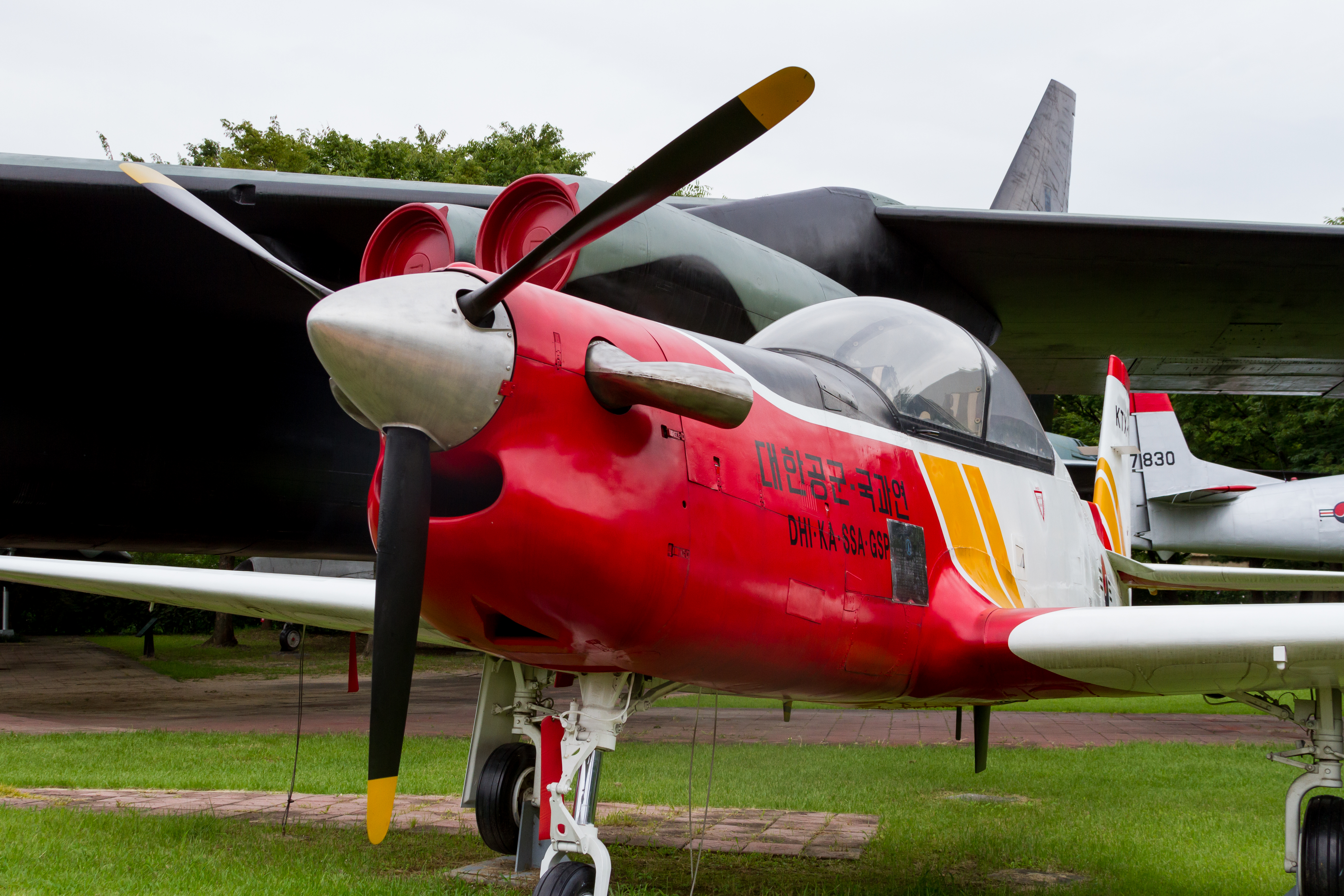
KT-1 Woongbi on display at the War Memorial of Korea

KTX-1 Yeo-myung
Prototype primary trainer each with a different engine fitted, six built. KTX-1 turboprop trainer in 1988, and the first prototype flew in 1991. The first two prototypes were powered by the 550-shp. Pratt & Whitney Canada PT6A-25A turboprop.

KT-1
KT-1 is the basic trainer of the ROKAF. Compared to the KTX-1 prototype, the KT-1 is bigger, heavier, the tail surfaces are relocated and it has a more powerful P&W Canada PT6A-62.(950-shp)

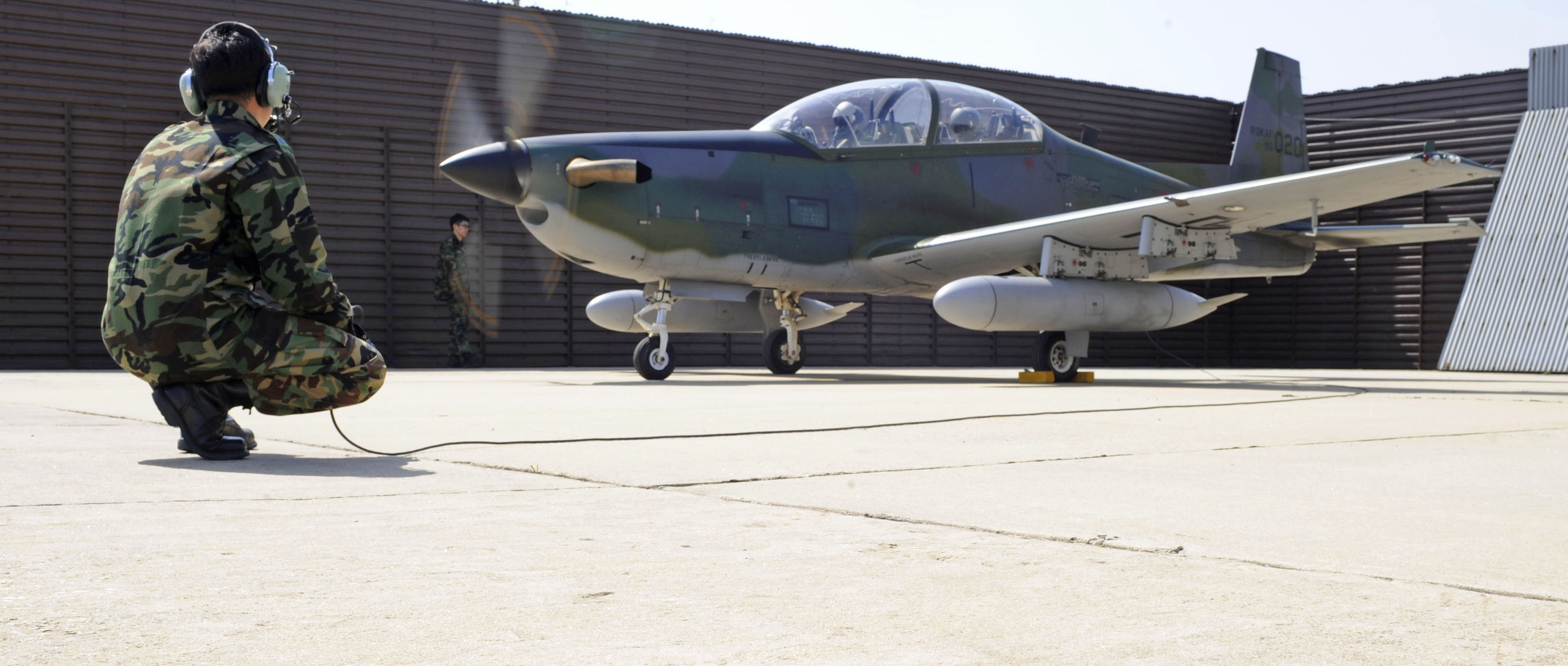
KA-1 at Osan Air Base, 2010.

KA-1
An armed advanced trainer with light-attack and forward air control capabilities. Several new features unique to the KA-1 are a head-up display and up-front control panel, MFD panels, and four hardpoints, two under each wing. The hardpoints can be equipped with rocket launchers and gun pods.

KT-1B

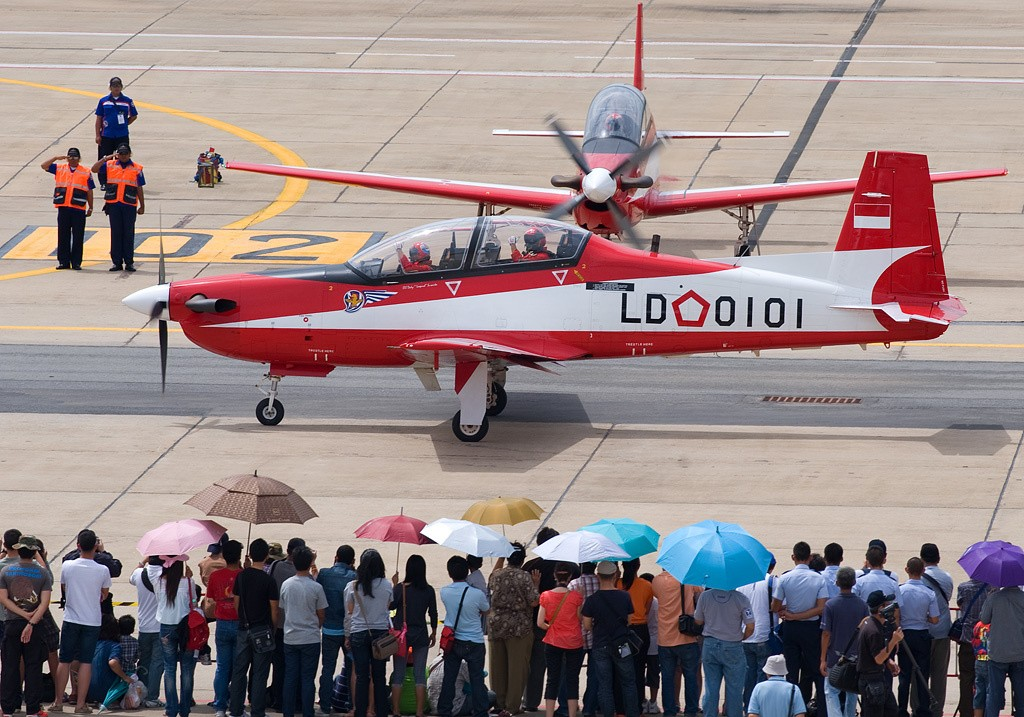
Indonesian Air Force KT-1B Woongbi

Export version for Indonesia. Main differences are in terms of avionics, some of which have been excluded or have had commercial off-the-shelf (COTS) alternatives used instead.

KT-1C
Improved, armed export version equipped with a centreline forward looking infrared pod. The KT-1C may also be equipped with a 12.7 mm gun pod, chaffes, flares, training missiles, rockets or unguided bombs.

KT-1T
Export version for Turkey.

KT-1P
Export version for Peru.

KA-1P
Armed export version for Peru.

KA-1S
Armed export version for Senegal.

== Operators ==
Indonesia

- Indonesian Air Force received 20 KT-1Bs. 15 operational

Republic of Korea

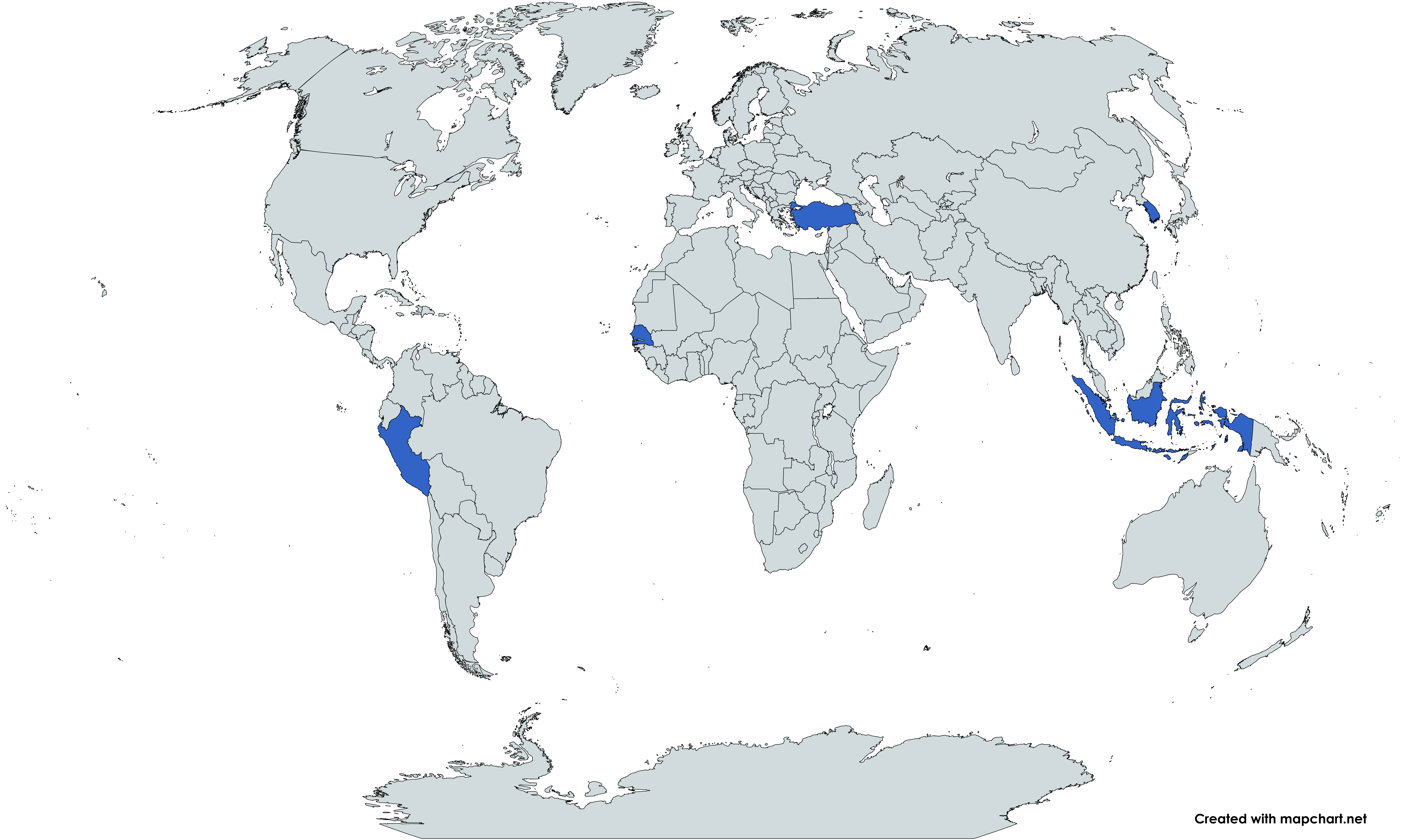
Operators of KT-1

- Republic of Korea Air Force received 85 KT-1s and 20 KA-1s

Peru

- Peruvian Air Force received a total of 20 aircraft (10 KT-1P and 10 KA-1P). These aircraft are in service with Escuadrón Aéreo 512, based at Pisco. The Peruvian Air Force named the KT-1P Torito (little Bull) in honour of the North American NA-50 flown by Peruvian air force hero José Quiñones Gonzales.

Senegal

- Senegalese Air Force - received 4 KA-1Ss.

Turkey

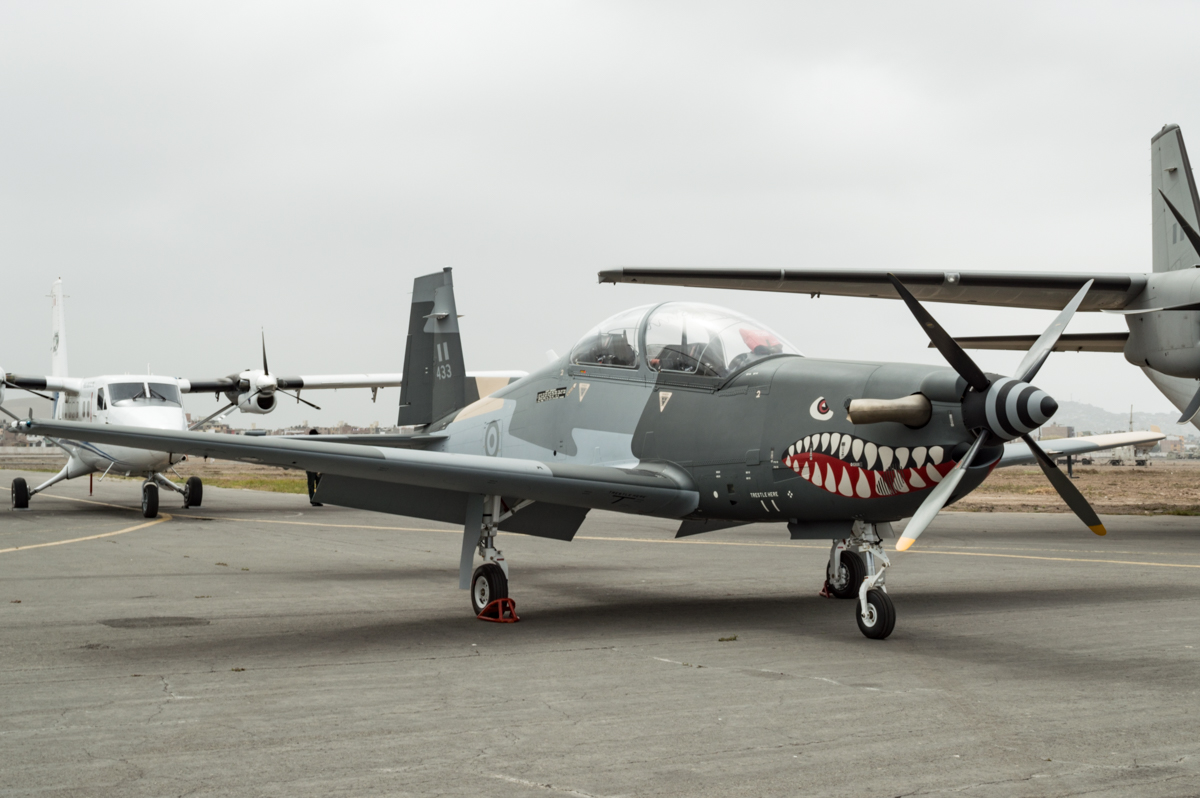
Peruvian Air Force KAI KA-1P

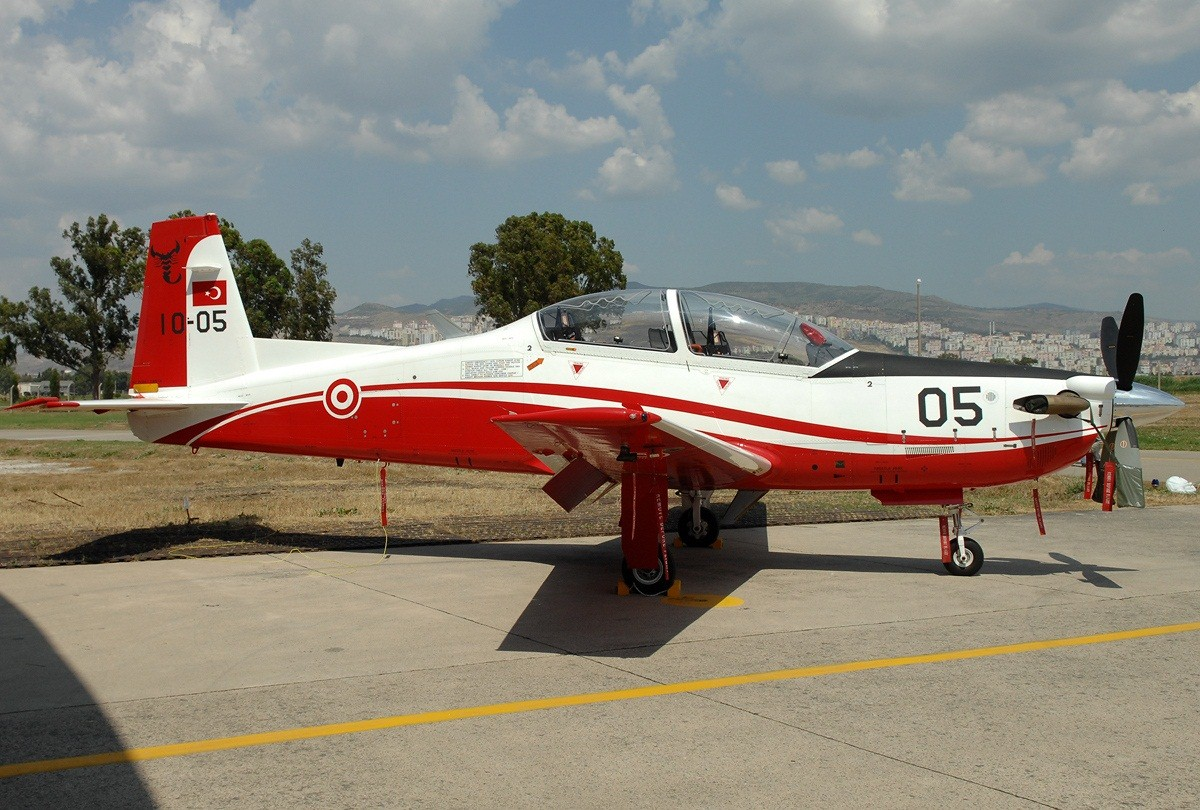
- Turkish Air Force KAI KT-1 Woongbi
  Turkish Air Force 40 KT-1Ts

== Accidents ==
On 13 November 2003, an ROKAF KT-1 crashed shortly after takeoff from Sacheon Airport. The instructor ejected safely while the trainee was killed.

On 15 March 2015, an Indonesian Air Force KT-1B registration "LD-0101" had a Mid-Air Collision during Rehearsal for LIMA Airshow in Langkawi International Airport. Both Pilots ejected and survived.

On 9 April 2021, a Turkish Air Force KT-1 trainer aircraft crashed in the Aegean Sea. Both pilots were recovered by Turkish Air Force search and rescue teams. While one pilot ejected, the remaining pilot managed to crash-land the KT-1 and preserved the structural integrity of the aircraft.

On 1 April 2022, four ROKAF pilots were killed after a pair of KT-1s crashed into each other over a mountain northeast of Sacheon.

On 26 December 2022, an ROKAF KA-1 crashed soon after takeoff after being dispatched in response to North Korean drones violating South Korean airspace. The crew escaped unharmed.

On 21 May 2025, a Peruvian Air Force KT-1P went missing near Pisco. Some hours later, debris was found on an islet south of Paracas Peninsula. The pilot was found dead after a sixteen-day search.

== Specifications (KT-1) ==
Data from Korea Aerospace Industries and Jane's All The World's Aircraft 2004–2005

General characteristics

- Crew: 2
- Length: 10.3 m (33 ft 10 in)
- Wingspan: 10.6 m (34 ft 9 in)
- Height: 3.7 m (12 ft 2 in)
- Wing area: 16.01 m^{2} (172.3 sq ft)
- Aspect ratio: 7
- Airfoil: root: NACA 63-218; tip: NACA 63-212
- Empty weight: 1,910 kg (4,211 lb)
- Gross weight: 2,540 kg (5,600 lb)
- Maximum fuel weight: 408 kg (899 lb)
- Max takeoff weight: 3,311 kg (7,300 lb) (and Maximum Landing Weight)with external stores

3,205 kg (7,066 lb) training/utility
2,540 kg (5,600 lb) aerobatic

- Fuel capacity: 551 L (146 US gal; 121 imp gal) in two wing tanks with provision for two 189 L (50 US gal; 42 imp gal) drop-tanks on the inboard pylons
- Powerplant: 1 × Pratt & Whitney Canada PT6A-62 turboprop engine, 708.4 kW (950.0 hp)
- Propellers: 4-bladed Hartzell HC-E4N-2/E9512CB-1, 2.44 m (8 ft 0 in) diameter constant-speed fully feathering reversible propeller

Performance

- Maximum speed: 644 km/h (400 mph, 348 kn) at 4,570 m (14,993 ft)
- Stall speed: 132 km/h (82 mph, 71 kn) flaps down
- Never exceed speed: 648 km/h (403 mph, 350 kn)
- Range: 1,333 km (828 mi, 720 nmi) at 7,620 m (25,000 ft) with max internal fuel (30 minutes reserve)
- Ferry range: 2,070 km (1,290 mi, 1,120 nmi) at 6,100 m (20,013 ft) with max internal and external fuel (30 minutes reserve)
- Endurance: <4 hours at 6,100 m (20,013 ft) with max internal fuel (30 minutes reserve)
- Service ceiling: 11,580 m (37,990 ft)
- g limits: +7 -3.5 (aerobatic, clean)

+4.5 -2.3 (with external stores)

- Rate of climb: 17.78 m/s (3,500 ft/min) at sea level, clean
- Wing loading: 206.8 kg/m^{2} (42.4 lb/sq ft) with external stores

200.2 kg/m^{2} (41 lb/sq ft) training/utility
158.7 kg/m^{2} (33 lb/sq ft) aerobatic

- Power/mass: 0.2137 kW/kg (0.1300 hp/lb)with external stores

0.221 kW/kg (0.134 hp/lb) training/utility
0.2785 kW/kg (0.1694 hp/lb) aerobatic

Armament

- provision for practice bomb carriers on four underwing pylons

== See also ==
- KAI T-50 Golden Eagle

Aircraft of comparable role, configuration, and era

- Beechcraft T-6 Texan II
- Embraer EMB 312 Tucano
- Fuji T-7
- Grob G 120TP
- Pilatus PC-9
- PZL-130 Orlik
- Short Tucano
- TAI Hürkuş
