= Jupiter Aerobatic Team =

- Jupiter Aerobatic Team patch
- Active: 2008- present
- Country: Indonesia
- Branch: Indonesian Air Force
- Role: Aerobatic display team
- Size: Approx. 16 Pilots
- Garrison/HQ: 102nd Education Squadron, Adisutjipto Air Force Base
- Colors: Red and White

Aircraft flown
- Trainer: Six KAI KT-1s

The Jupiter Aerobatic Team is the current Indonesian Air Force aerobatic display team flying with six KT-1B Wongbee aircraft painted in red and white. The team is drawn from the Skadik (Skadron Pendidikan / Training Squadron) 102, Adisucipto International Airport, Yogyakarta. The Jupiter team aircraft are equipped with white smoke generators. The pilots of the "Jupiter Aerobatic Team (JAT)" are all instructors. The team is named "JUPITER" after the call-sign of Indonesian Air Force instructors.

== History ==
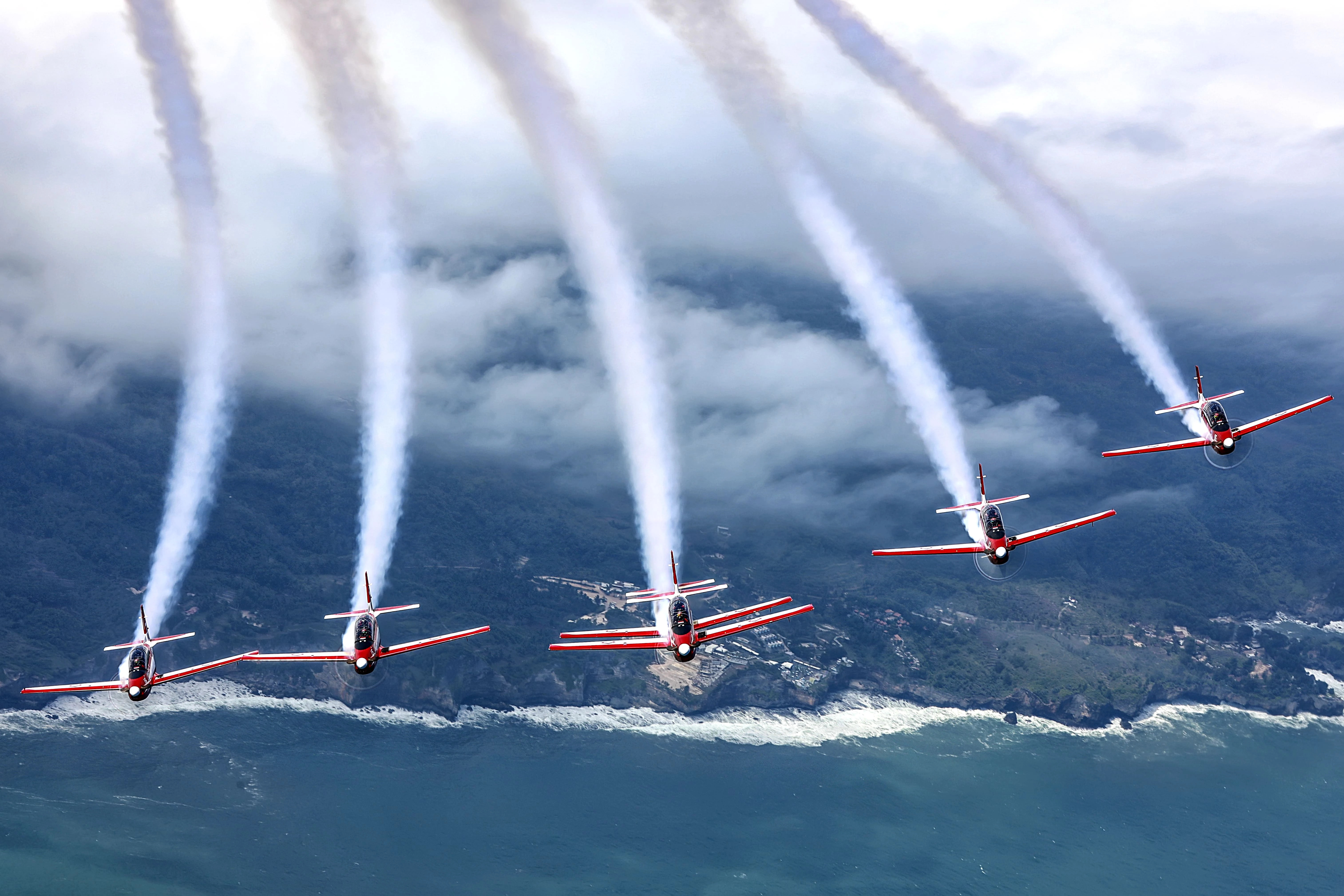
Indonesian Air Force KT-1. Jupiter Aerobatic Team

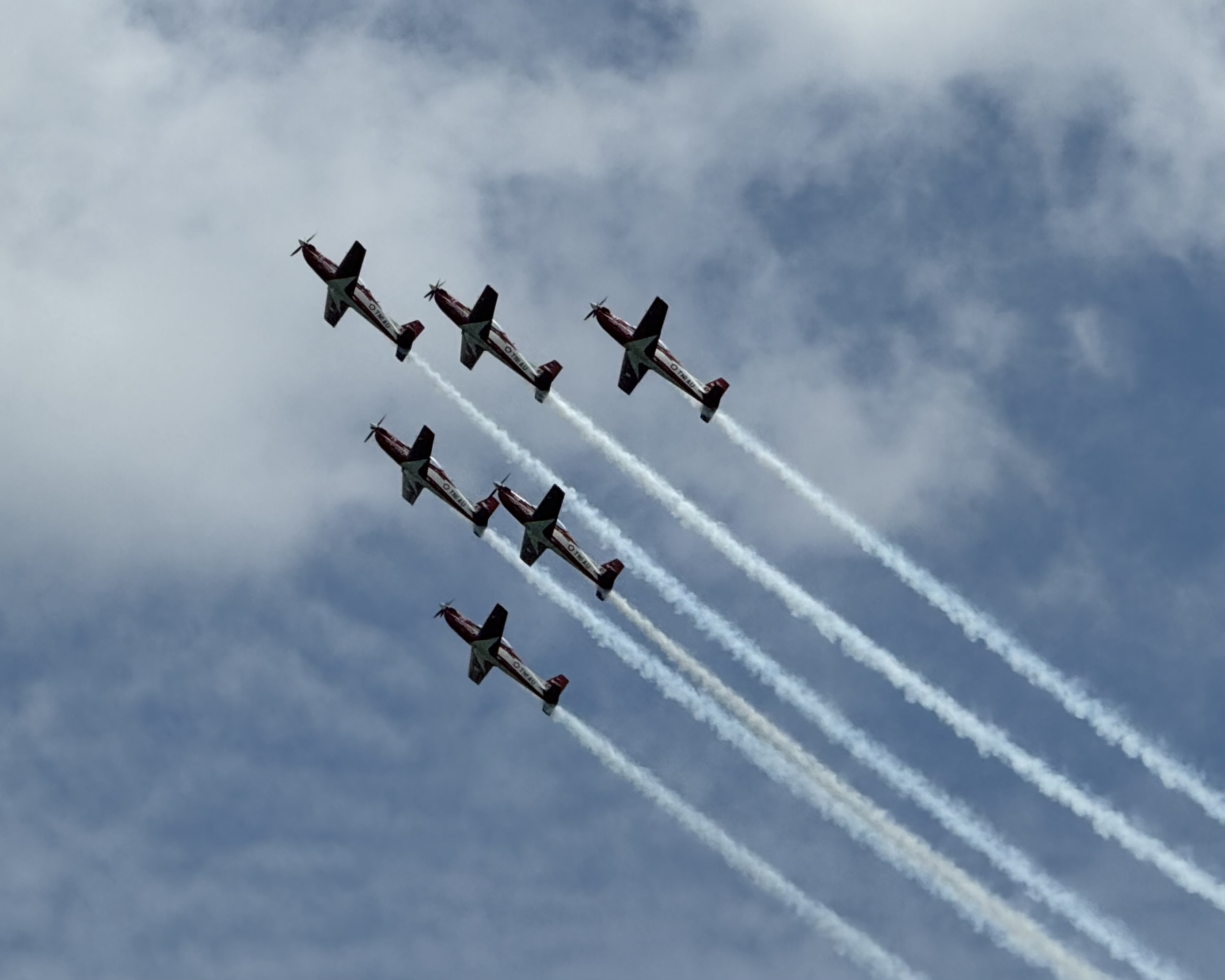
Jupiter Aerobatic Team at the 2024 Singapore Airshow

In 1996, a new Indonesian Air Force aerobatic team was formed and equipped with eight BAE Hawk Mk. 53 planes from Skadik 103. This team was named "Jupiter" and they performed for the first time on September 23, 1997. In 2001, the team became "Jupiter Blue" after merging with the "Elang Biru" team, which was disbanded due to financial crisis in late 1990s.

The "Jupiter Aerobatic Team" (JAT) was re-formed in 2008, using 4 Korean Aerospace Industries KT-1B Wongbee trainers. This new team's first public show was on July 4, 2008 in Yogyakarta and their second show was in Jakarta in November 2008.

In 2010, after two years of stagnation, JAT began a training program with help from Australian Roulettes display team. In September 2010, two JAT pilots were sent to Australia to observe and practice flying maneuvers together with the Roulettes at their home base in East Sale, Victoria, Australia. On November 8, 2010, the Roulettes then performed in Halim Air Force Base, Jakarta in which six JAT members each had the opportunity to fly in the back seat of the "Roulettes" PC-9s during their practice.

In 2011, the JAT increased to six aircraft in the formation and also received a new red-white color livery similar to the colors of the Indonesian flag. The first demonstration with this new six-ship composition was on March 16, 2011 in Yogyakarta at the launching of the new livery ceremony by the Indonesian Air Force. Their second airshow was on April 9 in Jakarta at the TNI AU's 65th anniversary and their third was on April 17, 2011, again in Yogyakarta.

== Incidents ==
On March 15, 2015, during a practice for LIMA 15', two aircraft (tail no.5 and no.6) clipped their wings in mid-air and crashed. All four crew of both aircraft ejected safely and suffered minor injuries. One of the aircraft crashed close to a house, setting it on fire and damaging nearby property, while the other crashed into an empty field. No ground injuries were reported as the house was unoccupied at the time of the accident. Indonesian First Force Marshal Indra Yadi later made the decision to pull the JAT out from LIMA 15' aerial display.
