= Senegalese patrol vessel Poponquine =

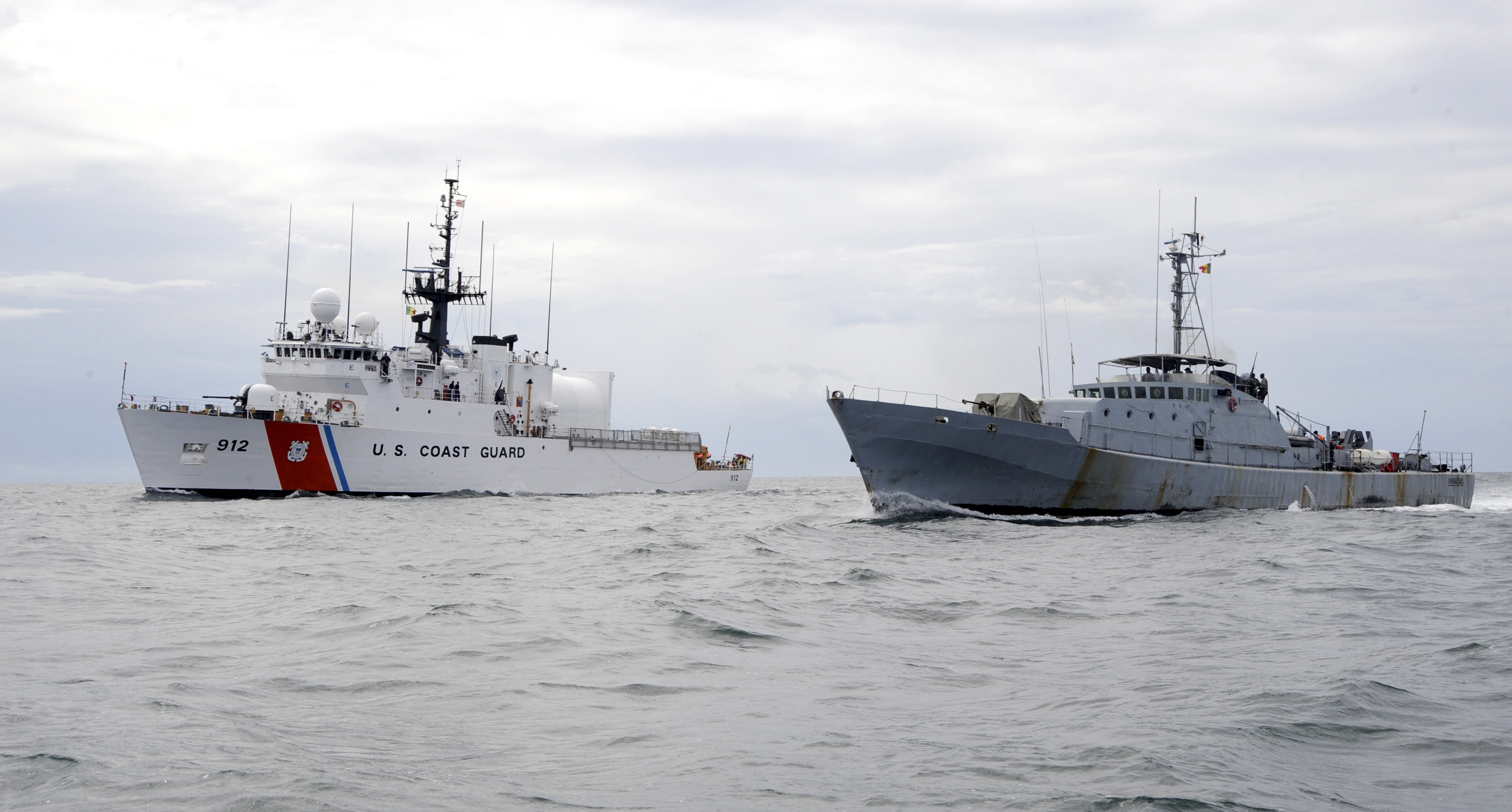
- USCGC Legare, left, patrols alongside Poponquine during joint operations as part of the Africa Partnership Station

History

Senegal
- Name: Poponquine
- Ordered: 1973
- Builder: SFCN, Villeneuve-la-Garenne, France
- Laid down: 20 November 1973
- Launched: 22 March 1974
- Commissioned: 10 August 1974
- Status: In active service

General characteristics
- Class & type: PR 48-class patrol vessel
- Displacement: 250 t (250 long tons) full load
- Length: 47.5 m (155 ft 10 in)
- Beam: 7.1 m (23 ft 4 in)
- Draught: 2.5 m (8 ft 2 in)
- Propulsion: 2 × SACM AGO V12 CZSHR diesel engines; 2 shafts, 3,240 kW (4,340 hp)
- Speed: 23 knots (43 km/h; 26 mph)
- Range: 2,000 nmi (3,700 km; 2,300 mi) at 16 knots (30 km/h; 18 mph)
- Complement: 33
- Sensors & processing systems: Furuno surface search radar
- Armament: 2 × Bofors 40 mm (1.6 in)/70 guns; 2 × 7.62 mm (0.3 in) machine guns

The Senegalese patrol vessel Poponquine is a Senegalese Navy patrol vessel. Poponquine was ordered in 1973 as one of three ships of the PR 48 class, locally known as the Saint-Louis class. The vessel was constructed in France and entered service in 1974. She has served on joint patrols with United States vessels.

== Design and description ==
Poponquine, a PR 48-class patrol vessel, has a displacement of 250 tonnes (250 long tons) fully loaded. The ship is 47.5 metres (155 ft 10 in) long with a beam of 7.1 metres (23 ft 4 in) and a draught of 2.5 m (8 ft 2 in). Poponquine is propelled by two SACM AGO V12 CZSHR diesel engines turning two shafts, rated 3,240 kilowatts (4,340 hp). This gives the ship a maximum speed of 23 knots (43 km/h; 26 mph) and a range of 2,000 nautical miles (3,700 km; 2,300 mi) at 16 knots (30 km/h; 18 mph).

The patrol vessel is armed with two Bofors 40 mm (1.6 in)/70 guns in a twin turret and single-mounted 7.62 mm (0.3 in) machine guns. Poponquine is equipped with a Furuno surface search radar. The ship has a complement of 33 including three officers.

== Construction and career ==
Poponquine was the second of three PR 48-class vessels ordered from French shipyards. The order for Poponquine was placed in 1973 with SFCN at their yard in Villeneuve-la-Garenne, France. The ship was laid down on 20 November 1973 and launched on 22 March 1974. Poponquine was commissioned on 10 August 1974.

In August 2009 Poponquine and USCGC Legare of the United States Coast Guard used one another as the target of boarding parties.
