= Taurus T4 =

Rifle

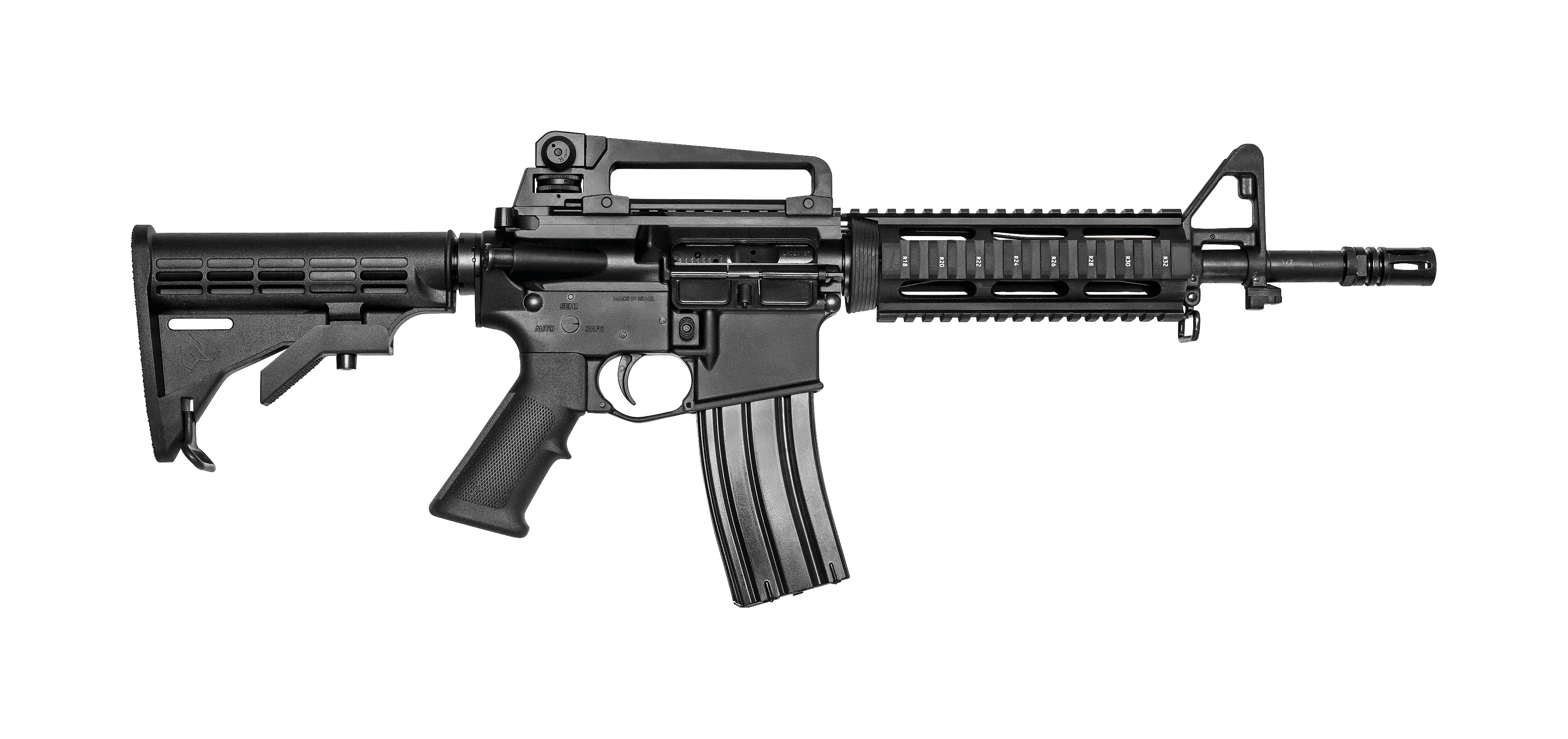
- Type: Assault rifle Carbine
- Place of origin: Brazil

Service history
- Used by: See Users
- Wars: Brazilian drug war Gang war in Haiti

Production history
- Designed: 2017

Specifications
- Mass: 3.05 kg without magazine
- Length: T4 14,5":870mm, 767mm collapsed; T4 11,5":811mm, 716mm (collapsed)
- Barrel length: 292.1mm (11.5 inches), 14,5 inch
- Caliber: 5.56×45mm NATO
- Action: Gas Direct impingement
- Feed system: 30-round (5.56 NATO) box magazines

The Taurus T4 is an assault rifle manufactured by Taurus Firearms.

== History ==
The Taurus T4 was presented at the 2017 SHOT Show.

== Design ==
The Taurus T4 is basically an M4 clone fully manufactured in the company's facilities now concentrated in the city of São Leopoldo, Brazil.

It is available in three versions with two different barrel lengths, all of which come with six-position telescopic stocks and picatinny accessory rails.

== Usage ==
The rifle is designed for military and police use.

However, in 2019, a decree legalised the possession of semi-automatic T4 carbines by Brazilian citizens, while versions with burst-fire or automatic modes remain illegal.

== Users ==
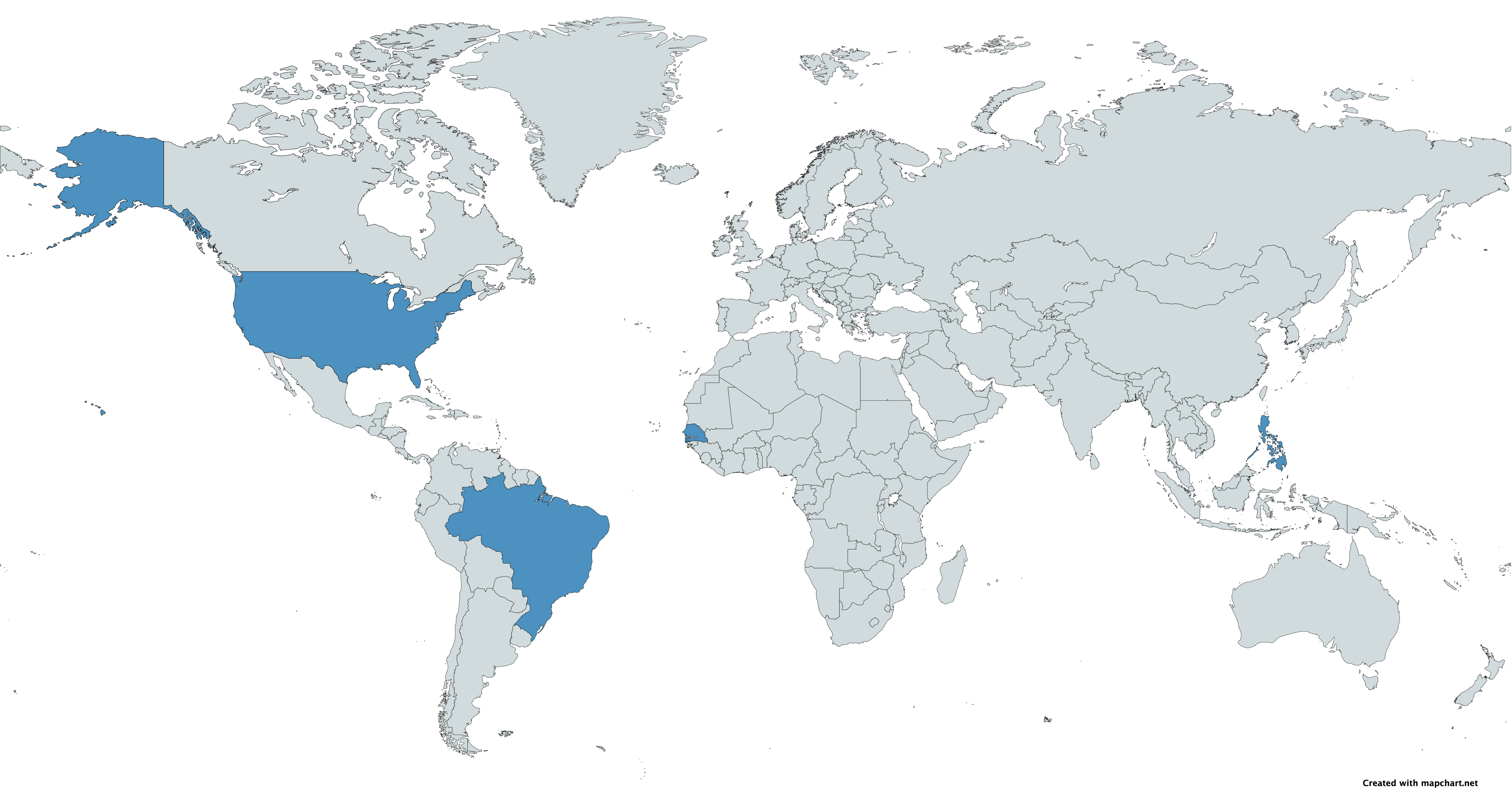
A map with users of the Taurus T4 in blue

- Brazil
  - Brazilian Army
  - Law enforcement in Brazil
- Haiti
  - Armed Forces of Haiti
- Philippines
  - Philippine Army
- Senegal
  - Armed Forces of Senegal
- United States
  - 37 T4s to City of Bainbridge Public Safety Department and Decatur County Sheriff’s Department.

=== Non state users ===
- Primeiro Comando da Capital

== See also ==
- AR-15
