= Armed Forces of Senegal =

Military of Senegal

Senegalese Armed Forces
- Forces armées du Sénégal
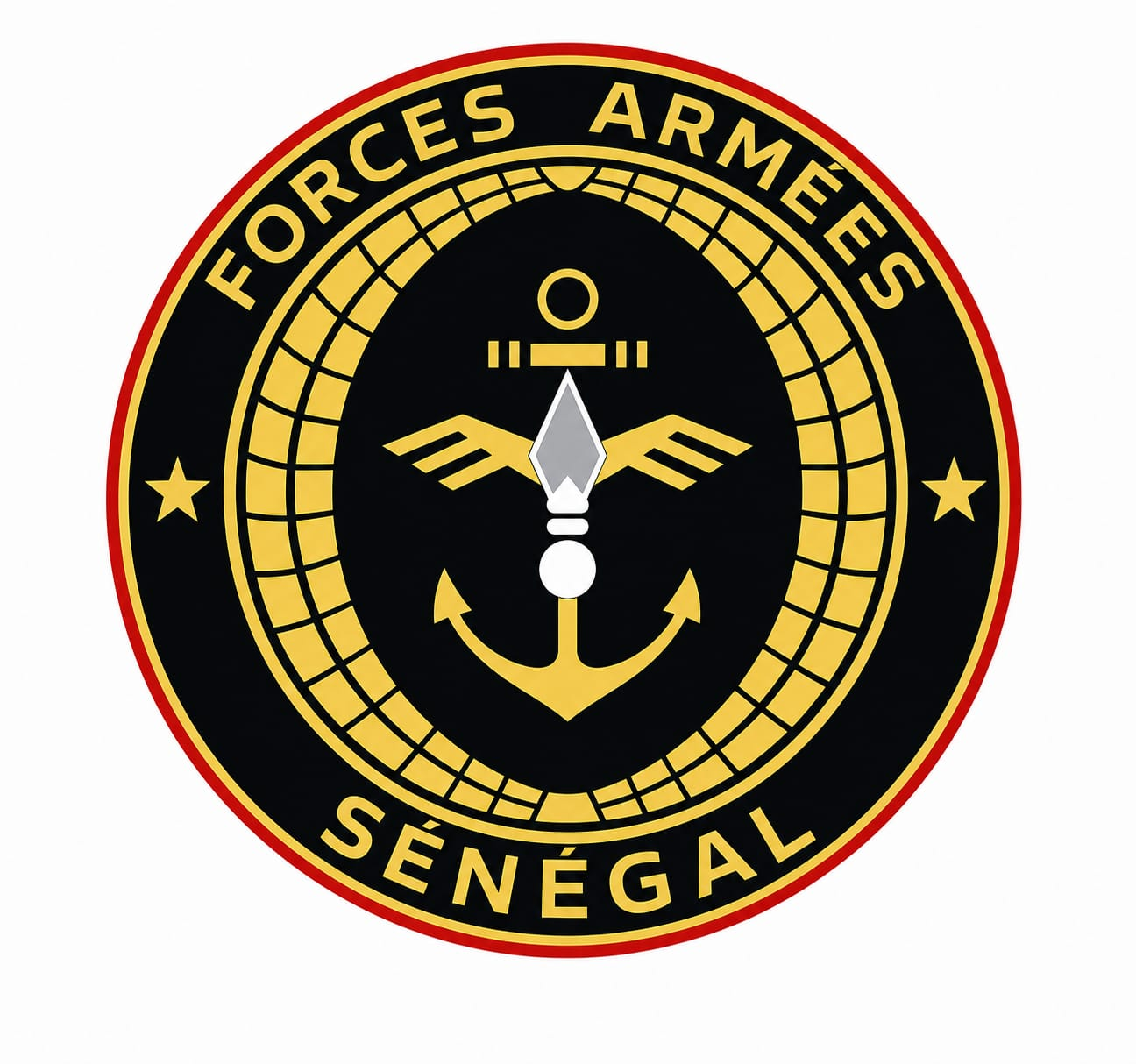
- Emblem of the Senegalese Armed Forces
- Founded: 1962
- Service branches: Army; Navy; Air Force; National Gendarmerie

Leadership
- President: Bassirou Diomaye Faye
- Minister of the Armed Forces: Sidiki Kaba
- Chief of the General Staff: General of Air Corps Mbaye Cissé

Personnel
- Active personnel: 17,000

Expenditure
- Budget: ~ $350 million (FY2018)
- Percent of GDP: ~1.5% (FY2018 est.)

Industry
- Foreign suppliers: Brazil; China; France; Germany; Indonesia; Israel; Russia; Republic of Korea; South Africa; Switzerland; Turkey; Vietnam; United States; Ukraine Historical: West Germany; Soviet Union; Republic of South Africa

Related articles
- History: Mauritania–Senegal Border War; Casamance conflict Gulf War; Guinea-Bissau Civil War; Insurgency in the Maghreb; 2008 invasion of Anjouan; Saudi Arabian-led intervention in Yemen; Invasion of the Gambia
- Ranks: Military ranks of Senegal

The Armed Forces of Senegal (French: Forces armées du Sénégal) consists of about 17,000 personnel in the army, air force, navy, and gendarmerie. The Senegal military force receives most of its training, equipment, and support from France and the United States. Germany also provides support but on a smaller scale.

Military noninterference in political affairs has contributed to Senegal's stability since independence. Senegal has participated in many international and regional peacekeeping missions. Most recently, in 2000, Senegal sent a battalion to the Democratic Republic of Congo to participate in MONUC, the United Nations peacekeeping mission.

Senegal also agreed to deploy a United States-trained battalion to Sierra Leone to participate in UNAMSIL, another UN peacekeeping mission. The training operation was designated Operation Focus Relief and involved U.S. Army Special Forces from 3rd Special Forces Group training a number of West African battalions, including Nigerian ones.

As one of the largest troop contributors in Africa (per capita) to African Union missions, United Nations missions, and other regional security organizations, the Senegalese military has been described as an effective military force on the African continent. This is notable given that Senegal is poorer than the average Sub-Saharan African country. Most importantly, the army of Senegal is multi-ethnic, not coup-proofed, and has never attempted a coup d'état, which is a uncommon in Africa. Harmonious Senegalese civil-military relations since independence have permitted the creation of 'military enclave' that functions as an institution separate from political leadership in Dakar.

== Summary of past military actions ==
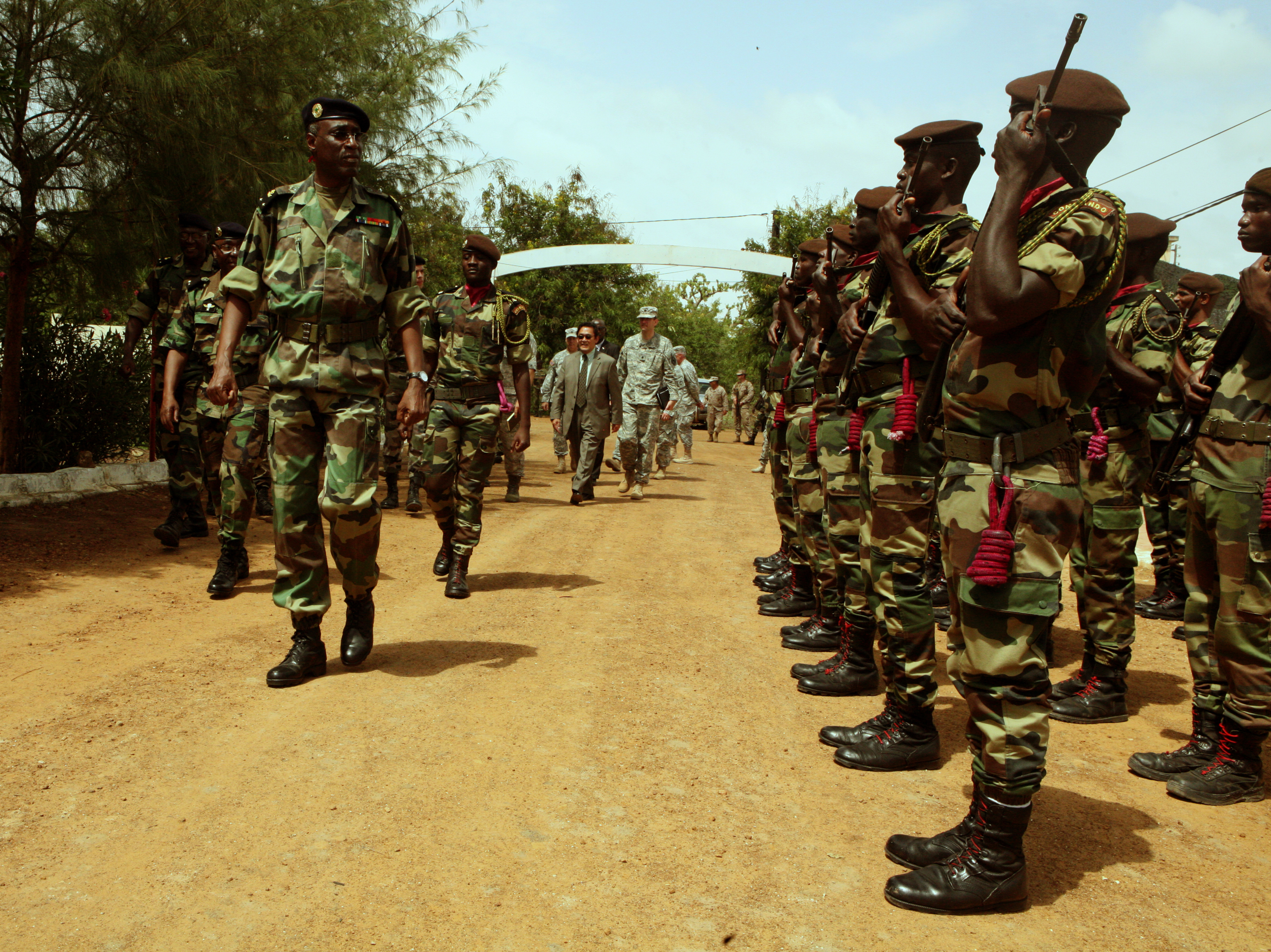
Commando battalion of Thiès.

- In October 1980 and August 1981, the Senegalese military was invited into the Gambia by President Dawda Kairaba Jawara to put down a coup attempt.
- In August 1989, Senegalese-Gambian military cooperation ceased with the dissolution of the Senegambian Confederation.
- In 1990, 500 Senegalese troops were deployed to Saudi Arabia to take part in the Gulf War. 92 of them were killed after the end of the conflict in a plane crash on 21 March 1991.
- In 1992 1,500 men were sent to the ECOMOG peacekeeping group in Liberia.
- In 1994, a battalion-sized force was sent to Rwanda to participate in the UN peacekeeping mission there.
- Senegal intervened in the Guinea-Bissau civil war in 1998 at the request of former President Vieira.
- A Senegalese contingent deployed on a peacekeeping mission to the Central African Republic in 1997.
- In 2017, Senegal deployed troops into the Gambia to support newly elected President Adama Barrow, an action legally justified by UN resolution 2337.

The Army (Armée de Terre) is the leading force within the Senegalese armed forces and provides the chief of staff and the Inspecteur général des forces armées.

== Organization ==
=== Military Areas ===
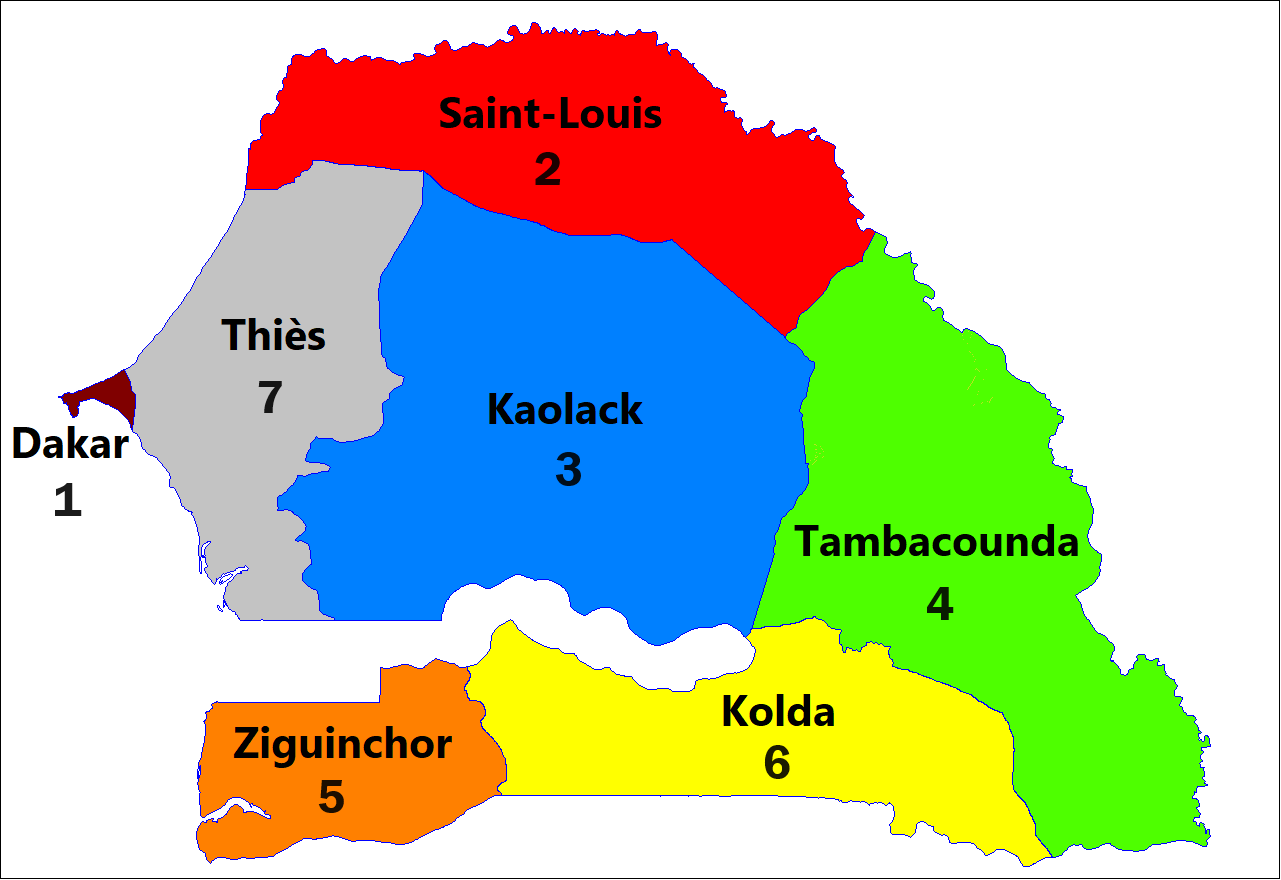
Senegal's Military zones.

At the present time, there are seven military zones:

- Zone n°1 - Dakar
- Zone n°2 - Saint-Louis
- Zone n°3 - Kaolack
- Zone n°4 - Tambacounda
- Zone n°5 - Ziguinchor
- Zone n°6 - Kolda
- Zone n°7 - Thiès

Each zone comprises a garrison office that caters to military issues and a social service office. The IISS Military Balance listed four zones in 2007.

=== Branches ===
==== Army ====
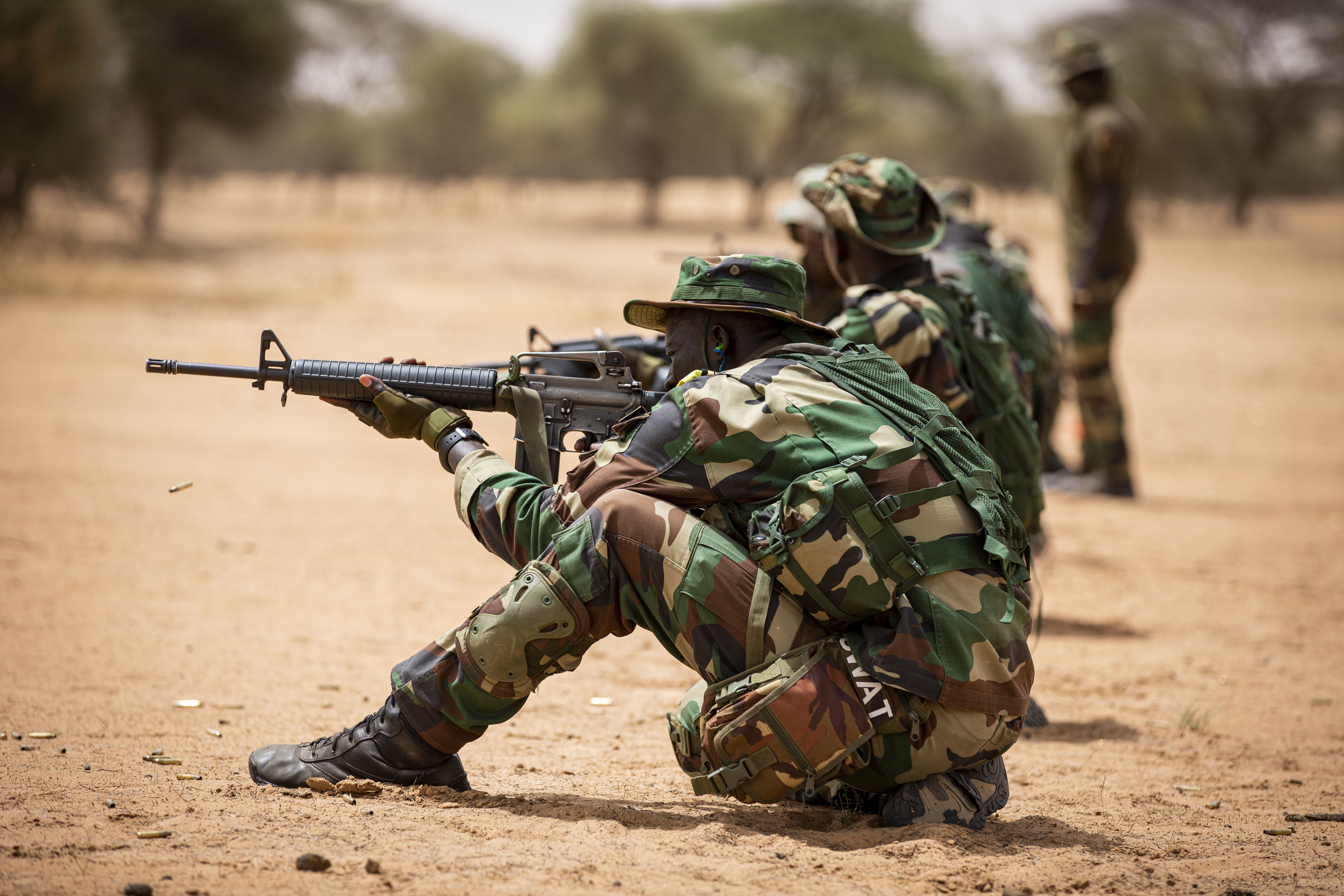
Senegalese soldiers during a training exercise.

Since independence from France in 1960, the army has gone through a large number of reorganisations. The army's heritage includes the Tirailleurs sénégalais. In 1978, Senegal dispatched a battalion to the Inter-African Force in Zaire, in the aftermath of the Shaba II fighting. The Senegalese contingent was under the command of Colonel Osmane Ndoye. The Senegalese force comprised a parachute battalion from Thiaroye.

The Army currently consists of two divisions, the Operations Division and the Logistic Division. The IISS estimated in 2012 that the Army had a strength of 11,900 soldiers, three armoured battalions the 22nd, 24th, and 25th (at Bignona) and the 26th Bataillon de reconnaissance et d'Appui at Kolda; there are six infantry battalions numbered 1st to 6th. 3rd Battalion may have been at Kaolack with 4th at Tambacounda at one point.

Also reported is the 12th Battalion of the 2nd Military Zone at Saint Louis (Dakhar Bango), along with the Prytanée militaire de Saint-Louis, a military secondary school.

Although the Senegalese Air Force is geared towards supporting it, the army may have previously maintained its own very small aviation branch, called the "Aviation Légère de l'Armée de Terre" (like the French army's equivalent), which may have counted up to five light helicopters and two SA330 Puma transport helicopters. The IISS Military Balance 2012 does not list any helicopters in army service.

==== National Gendarmerie ====
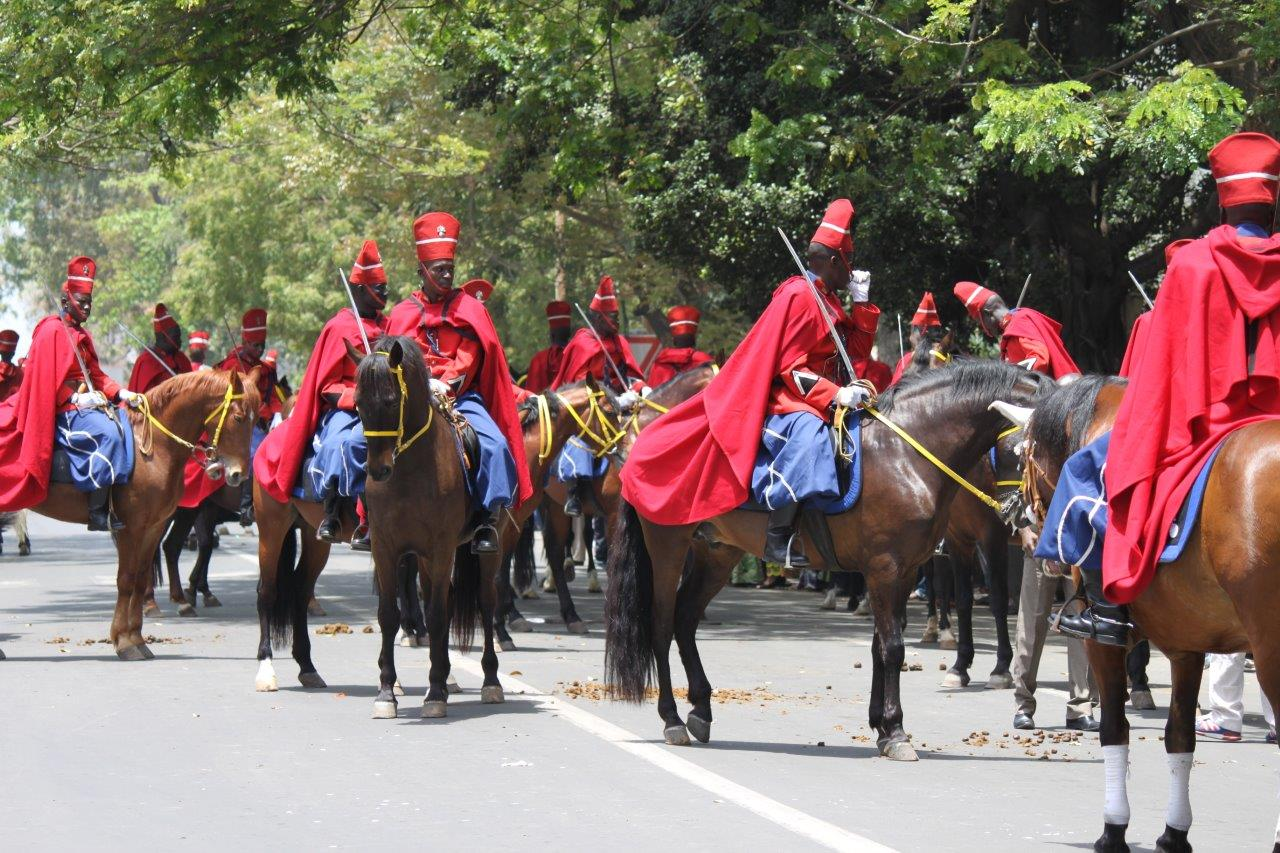
Red Guard of Senegal.

The Gendarmerie is a military force which provides policing and security. It includes a Territorial Gendarmerie with general policing duties, and a Mobile Gendarmerie for special tasks and serious public disorder.

The Senegalese gendarmerie evolved out of a French colonial Spahi detachment sent to Senegal in 1845. This detachment (which became today's Red Guard of Senegal) was the cadre around which the "Colonial Gendarmerie" was formed. On independence this became the National Gendarmerie.

The commander is General Abdoulaye Fall (a different person from the current Armed Forces Chief of Staff of the same name), whose rank is divisional general, and whose full job title is "High Commander of the Gendarmerie and Director of Military Justice".

==== Navy ====
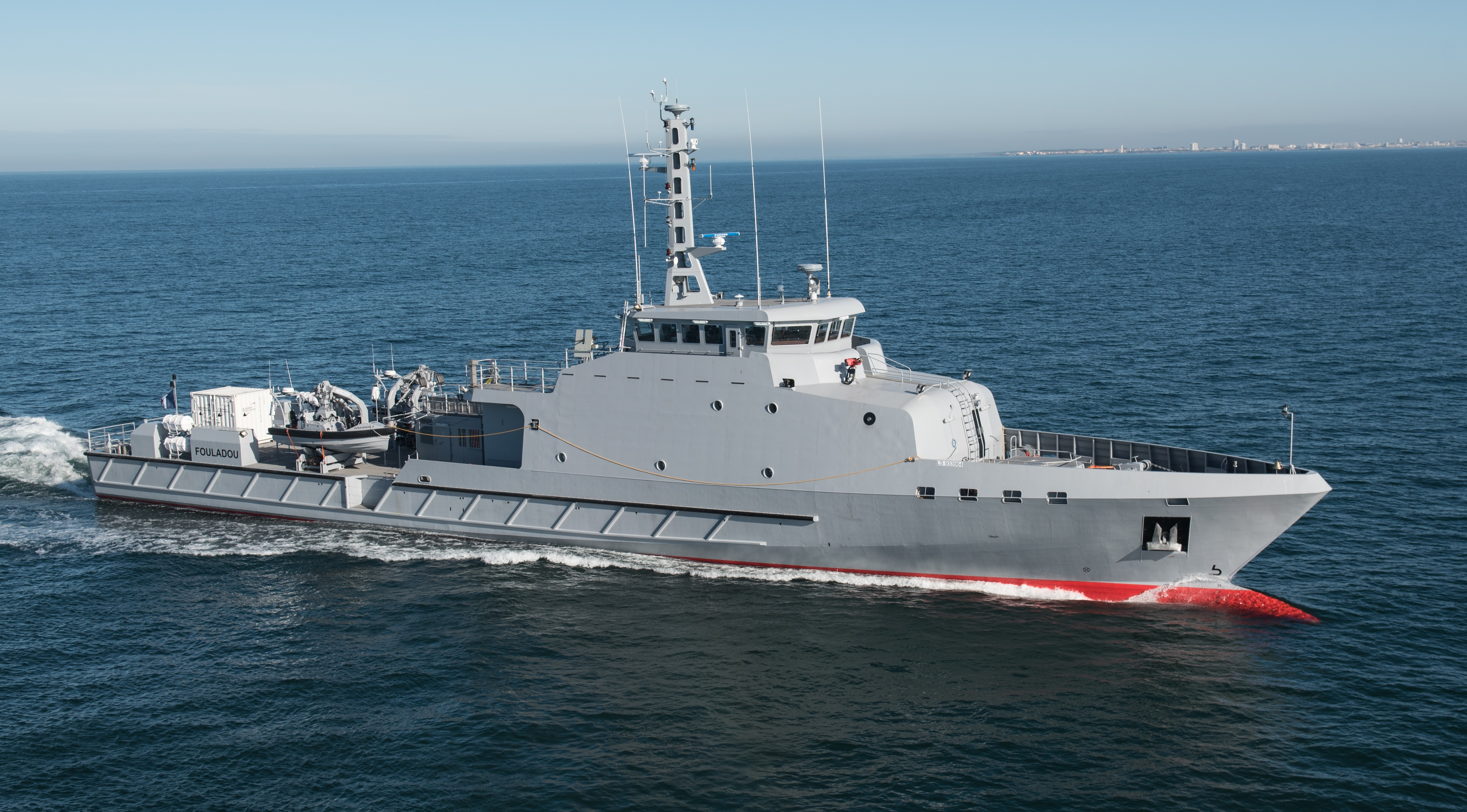
The Senegalese patrol boat Fouladou

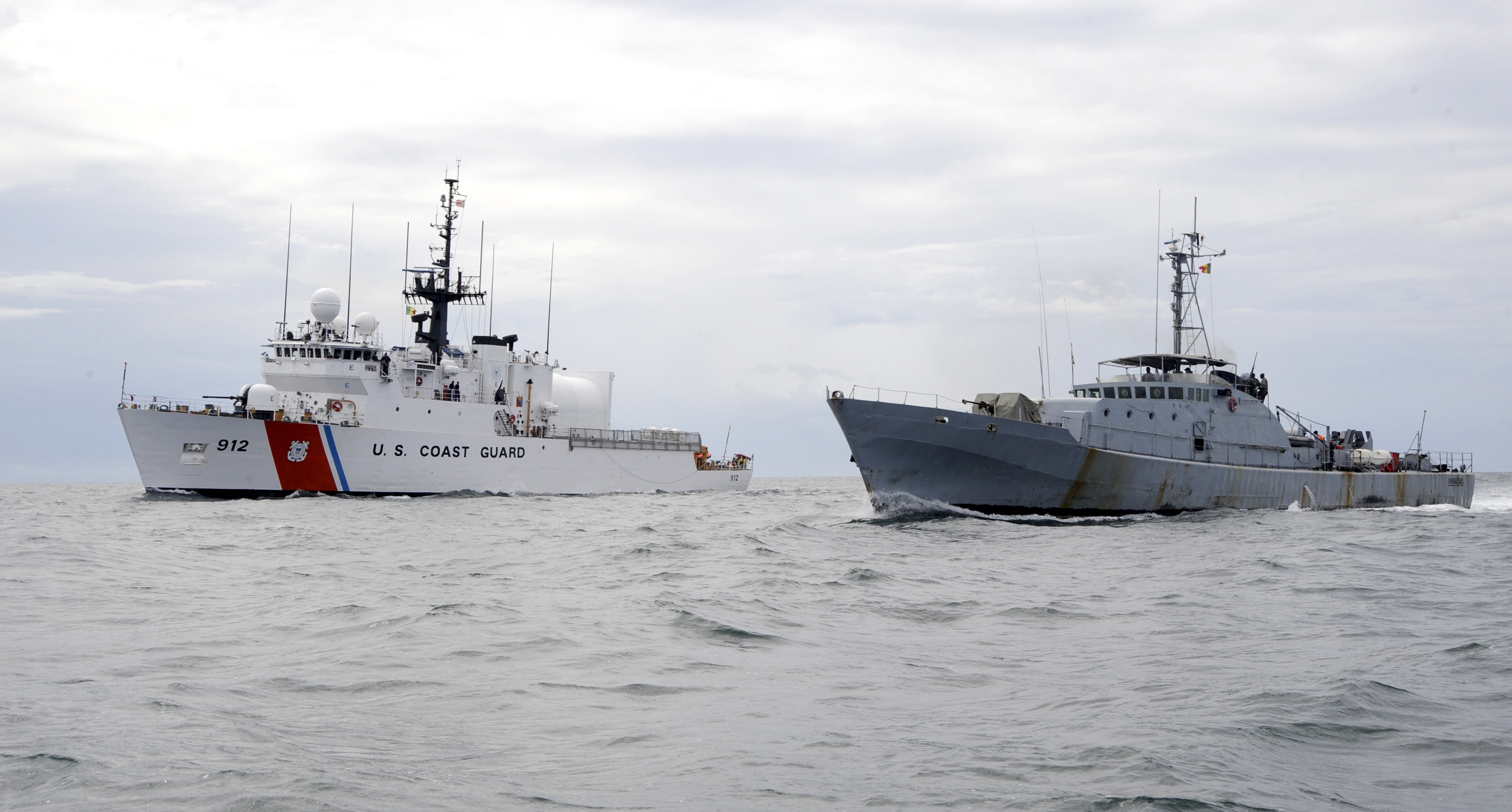
Senegalese patrol vessel Poponquine training with a United States Coast Guard vessel off the coast of Senegal

The navy (marine), also known as the Armée de mer, is of small size and is commanded by a ship-of-the-line captain. It is responsible for securing Senegal's 286-nautical-mile (530-kilometre) Atlantic coastline which is strategically located on the extreme west of the African continent. The coastline is divided in two by The Gambia. The navy was created in 1975. The Navy operates two bases, one at Dakar and the other at Elinkine. The navy also patrols the 12-nautical-mile (22-kilometre) territorial waters as well as a declared 200-nautical-mile (370-kilometre) exclusive economic zone.

The Navy is divided into three branches known as "groupings":

- The Operational Naval Grouping (Groupement Naval Opérationnel), which is divided into three flotillas and one group:
  - The High Seas Patrol Boats (Patrouilleurs de Haute Mer),
  - The Coastal Surveillance Vessels (Bâtiments de Surveillance Côtière),
  - The Fast Coastal Boats (Vedettes Côtières Rapides) and
  - The Transport Group (groupe de transport).
- The Naval Support Grouping (Groupement de Soutien de la Marine) responsible for ports, repairs, training, and logistics.
- The Fluvial-Maritime Surveillance Grouping.

==== Air Force ====
Air Force Roundel.

The air force (Armée de l'Air) is orientated towards providing support for ground forces and resembles an army aviation corps. It possesses Mil Mi-24 gunship helicopters, as well as transport and reconnaissance aircraft.

== Equipment ==
Infantry Attire and Gears
Name	Image	Type	Notes
Combat Helmet
Modèle 1951 helmet		Combat Helmet	Limited use
PASGT		Combat Helmet	Standard issue
FAST		Combat Helmet	Used by Special Forces
TSh-4M		Crewman Helmet	Standard issue
Attire/Combat Uniform
Camouflage Central-Europe		Attire Combat uniform	Standard issued.
Desert Camouflage Uniform		Attire Combat uniform	Used by Special Forces
MultiCam		Attire Combat uniform	Used by Special Forces

=== Army ===
==== Small arms ====
Name	Image	Caliber	Type	Origin	Notes
Pistols
Walther PP		.25 ACP	Semi-automatic pistol	Germany	
PAMAS G1		9×19mm	Semi-automatic pistol	Italy France	
MAC 50		9×19mm	Semi-automatic pistol	France	
Manurhin MR 73		.357 Magnum	Revolver	France	
Submachine guns
MAS-38		7.65×20mm	Submachine gun	France	
MAT-49		9×19mm	Submachine gun	France	
SMT9		9×19mm	Submachine gun	Brazil	
Rifles
FAMAS		5.56×45mm	Bullpup Assault rifle	France	
M16		5.56×45mm	Assault rifle	United States	
M4		5.56×45mm	Carbine Assault rifle	United States	
CAR-15		5.56×45mm	Carbine Assault rifle	United States	
Taurus T4		5.56×45mm	Carbine Assault rifle	Brazil	
Norinco CQ		5.56×45mm	Assault rifle	China	
Daewoo K1		.223 Remington	Carbine Assault rifle	South Korea	Received 280 K1A rifles in 2003.
Daewoo K2		5.56×45mm	Carbine Assault rifle	South Korea	
IWI Tavor		5.56×45mm	Bullpup Assault rifle	Israel	
IWI Tavor X95		5.56×45mm	Bullpup Assault rifle	Israel	
Heckler & Koch G3		7.62×51mm	Battle rifle	West Germany; France	French-made G3s
SIG SG 540		7.62×51mm	Battle rifle	Switzerland	
MAS-36		7.5×54mm	Bolt-action rifle	France	
MAS-49/56		7.5×54mm	Semi-automatic rifle	France	
Sniper rifles
SVD		7.62×54mmR	Sniper rifle Designated marksman rifle	Soviet Union	
KNT-76		7.62×51mm	Designated marksman rifle	Turkey	
IWI Galatz		5.56×45mm	Designated marksman rifle	Israel	
Machine guns
IWI Negev		5.56×45mm	Light machine gun	Israel	
AA-52		7.62×51mm	General-purpose machine gun	France	
Heckler & Koch HK21		7.62×51mm	General-purpose machine gun	West Germany	
M60		7.62×51mm	General-purpose machine gun	United States	
Browning M2		.50 BMG	Heavy machine gun	United States	
Rocket propelled grenade launchers
RPG-7		40mm	Rocket-propelled grenade	Soviet Union	
LRAC F1		89mm	Shoulder-launched missile weapon	France	

==== Anti-tank weapons ====
Name	Image	Type	Origin	Caliber	Notes
MILAN		Anti-tank missile	France West Germany		496

==== Anti-aircraft weapons ====
Name	Image	Type	Origin	Quantity	Status	Notes
Bofors L/60		Autocannon	Sweden	12		
20 mm modèle F2 gun		Autocannon	France	21		Used for air defence.

==== Artillery ====
Name	Image	Type	Origin	Quantity	Status	Notes
Rocket artillery
Bastion-01		Multiple rocket launcher	Ukraine	6		
Field artillery
M101		Howitzer	United States	6		
M-50		Howitzer	France	6		
TRF1		Howitzer	France	8		
Mortars
MO-120-RT-61		Towed mortar	France	32		

==== Tank destroyers ====
Name	Image	Type	Origin	Quantity	Status	Notes
WMA-301		Tank destroyer	China	12		

==== Infantry fighting vehicles ====
Name	Image	Type	Origin	Quantity	Status	Notes
Ratel IFV		Infantry fighting vehicle	South Africa	26		

==== Armored personnel carriers ====
Name	Image	Type	Origin	Quantity	Status	Notes
Panhard M3		Armoured personnel carrier	France	16		
M3 half-track		Half-track; Armored personnel carrier	United States	12		
WZ-551		Command post	China	1		
EE-11 Urutu		Amphibious Armored personnel carrier	Brazil	Unknown		
RG-31 Nyala		Infantry mobility vehicle	South Africa	Unknown		
Dozor-B		Infantry mobility vehicle	Ukraine	6		

==== Reconnaissance ====
Name	Image	Type	Origin	Quantity	Status	Notes
Panhard AML		Armored car	France	53		
Eland-90		Armored car	South Africa	47		
RAM MK3		Armored Car	Israel	55		

==== Mine-Resistant Ambush Protected ====
Name	Image	Type	Origin	Quantity	Status	Notes
Casspir		MRAP	South Africa	9		
Katmerciler Hizir II		MRAP	Turkey	N/A		
PUMA M26-15		MRAP	South Africa	30		
Ejder Yalçın		MRAP	Turkey	25		

==== Utility vehicles ====
Name	Image	Type	Origin	Quantity	Status	Notes
Humvee		Light utility vehicle	United States	23		
M151		Utility vehicle	United States	Unknown		

== Offshore Patrol Vessel ==
Current vessels	Image	Origin	Class	Type	Notes
Walo		France	OPV 58 S Class	Patrol boat	Commissioned in 2023
Niani		France	OPV 58 S Class	Patrol boat	Commissioned in 2024
Cayor		France	OPV 58 S Class	Patrol boat	Commissioned in 2026

- 2 Metal Shark patrol ships
- 3 Shaldag MK II patrol ships
- 1 Shaldag MK V patrol ships

== Citations ==
Part of this article is derived from the equivalent article at French Wikipedia
