= Birame Diop =

Senegalese politician and military administrator (born 1961)

General Birame Diop
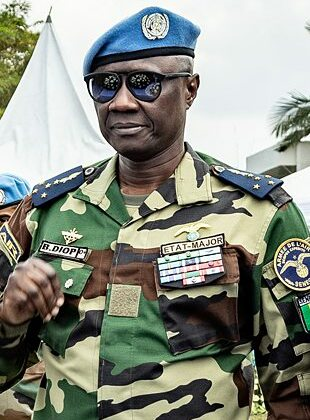
- Birame Diop in 2022

Minister of Armed forces
- President: Bassirou Diomaye Faye

Personal details
- Born: March 29, 1961 (age 65) Thiès

Military service
- Allegiance: Senegal

Birame Diop (born 29 March 1961) is a Senegalese politician and the Senegal minister of armed forces. He was the Chief of staff of the Air Force (2015–2017), Chief to the General staff of the armed forces, and the United Nations Military Adviser from May 2021 to April 2024.

== Honors and awards ==
- Officer of the Order of the Legion of Honour
- Officer of the National Order of the Lion
