= Operation Grapeshot order of battle =

Order of battle for 1945 Allied offensive in Italy

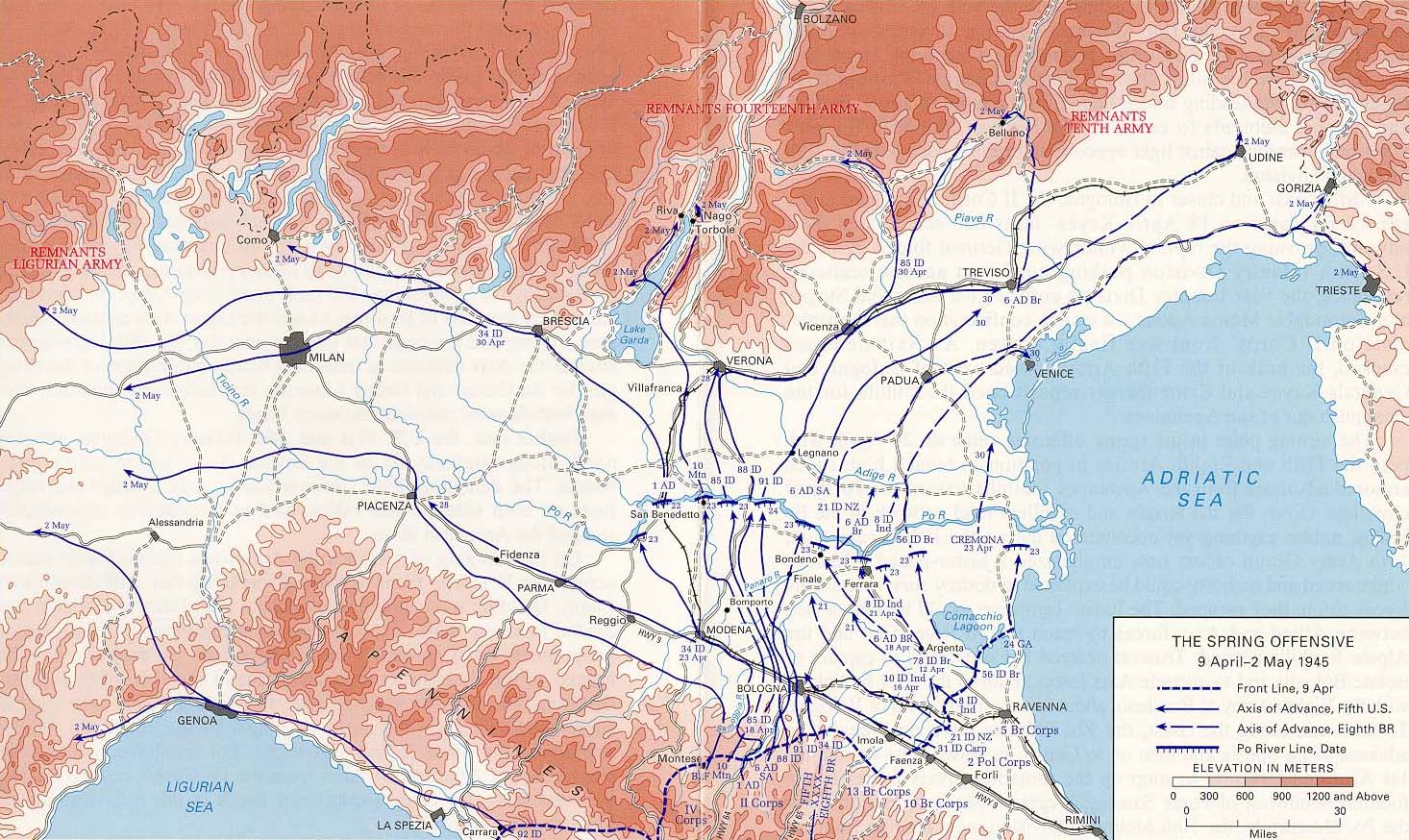
Map of Allied offensive in Po Valley

The Spring 1945 offensive in Italy, codenamed Operation Grapeshot, was the final Allied attack during the Italian Campaign in the final stages of the Second World War. The attack into the Lombard Plain by the Allied 15th Army Group started on 6 April 1945 and ended on 2 May with the surrender of Axis forces in Italy.

== Allied Forces Headquarters Mediterranean ==
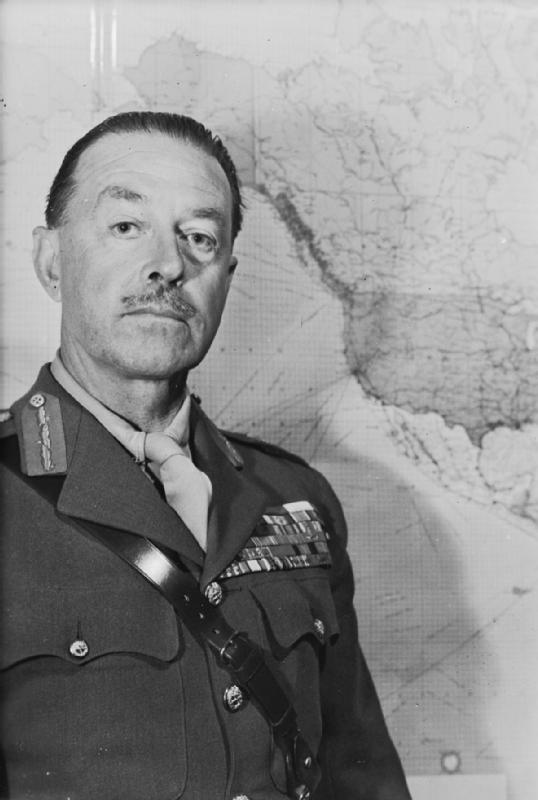
Field Marshal Sir Harold Alexander

Mark Wayne Clark as a lieutenant general

Supreme Allied Commander, Mediterranean Theatre
Field Marshal Sir Harold Alexander

Deputy: Lieutenant General Joseph T. McNarney
Chief of Staff: Lieutenant-General William Morgan
Air Commander-in Chief Mediterranean Allied Air Forces: Lieutenant General John K. Cannon

=== Allied 15th Army Group ===
General Mark Wayne Clark

Chief of Staff: Major General Alfred M. Gruenther

==== US Fifth Army ====
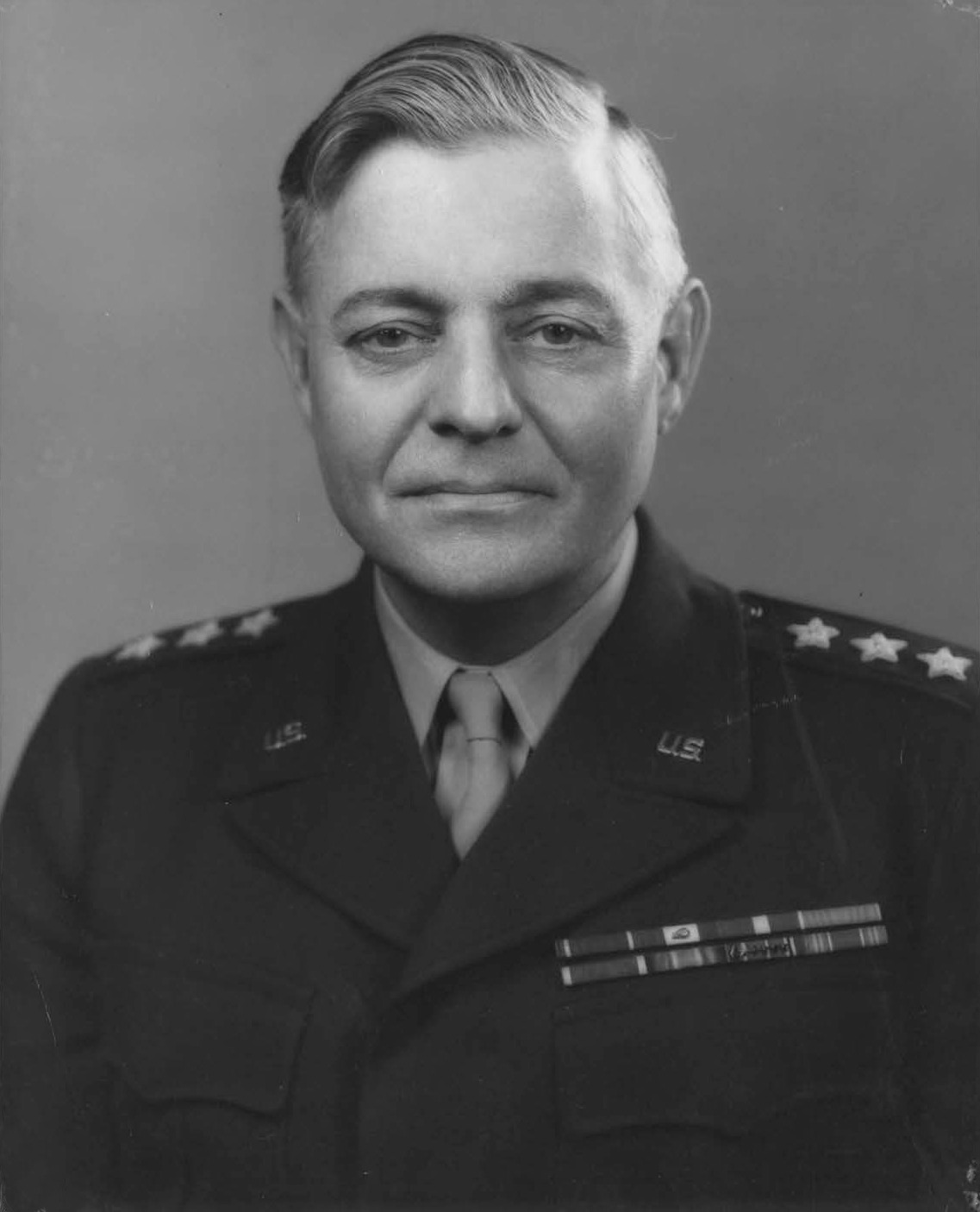
Lt. Gen. Lucian K. Truscott

Lieutenant General Lucian K. Truscott

Army troops

85th Infantry Division
Major General John B. Coulter

Infantry: 337th, 338th, 339th Infantry Regiments
Artillery–105mm: 328th, 329th, 910th Field Artillery Battalions
Artillery–155mm: 403rd Field Artillery Battalion

92nd Infantry Division (Colored) (Note: I.e., all black)
Major General Edward M. Almond

Infantry: 370th (Colored), 442nd (Nisei), (Note: Japanese-American) (Note: Attached 30 Mar 1945) 473rd (Note: Attached 24 Feb 1945) Infantry Regiments
Artillery–105mm: 597th, 598th, 599th, 600th Field Artillery Battalions (all Colored)
Armor–Tank: 758th Light Tank Battalion, 760th Tank Battalion (less two companies)
Armor–TD: 679th, 894th Tank Destroyer Battalion (less two companies)

Corps deployed west to east:

===== IV Corps =====
Lieutenant General Willis D. Crittenberger

Corps troops

365th Infantry Regiment (Note: Detached from 92nd Infantry Division)
371st Infantry Regiment (Note: Detached from 92nd Infantry Division)
751st Tank Battalion (plus one company 760th Tank Battalion)
701st Tank Destroyer Battalion (plus elements 894th Tank Destroyer Battalion)

1st Armored Division
Major General Vernon Prichard

Armor: 1st, 4th, 13th Tank Battalions
Infantry: 6th, 11th, 14th Armored Infantry Battalions
Artillery: 27th, 68th, 91st Armored Field Artillery Battalions

10th Mountain Division
Major General George Price Hays

Infantry: 85th, 86th, 87th Infantry Regiments
Artillery: 604th, 605th, 616th Field Artillery Battalions
Armor: 10th Mountain Antitank Battalion

Brazilian Expeditionary Force
General Mascarenhas de Morais

1st Brazilian Infantry Regiment
6th Brazilian Infantry Regiment
11th Brazilian Infantry Regiment
Mountain Infantry Battalion

===== II Corps =====
Major General Geoffrey Keyes

Corps troops

Combat Group "Legnano" (Italian Co-Belligerent Army)

68th Infantry Regiment "Legnano"
Special Infantry Regiment "Legnano"
11th Field Artillery Regiment

752nd, 757th Tank Battalions
804th, 805th Tank Destroyer Battalions

34th Infantry Division
Major General Charles L. Bolté
Deputy: Brig. Gen. Harry B. Sherman

Infantry: 133rd, 135th, 168th Infantry Regiments
Artillery–105mm: 125th, 151st, 175th Field Artillery Battalions
Artillery–155mm: 185th Field Artillery Battalion

88th Infantry Division
Major General Paul W. Kendall
Deputy: Brig. Gen. James C. Fry

Infantry: 349th, 350th, 351st Infantry Regiments
Artillery–105mm: 337th, 338th, 913th Field Artillery Battalions
Artillery–155mm: 339th Field Artillery Battalion

91st Infantry Division
Major General William G. Livesay
Deputy: Brig. Gen. Raymond E. S. Williamson

Infantry: 361st, 362nd, 363rd Infantry Regiments
Artillery–105mm: 346th, 347th, 916th Field Artillery Battalions
Artillery–155mm: 348th Field Artillery Battalion

6th South African Armoured Division
Major-General Evered Poole

11th South African Armoured Brigade
12th South African Motorised Brigade
13th South African Motorised Brigade

==== British Eighth Army ====
Lieutenant-General Sir Richard McCreery

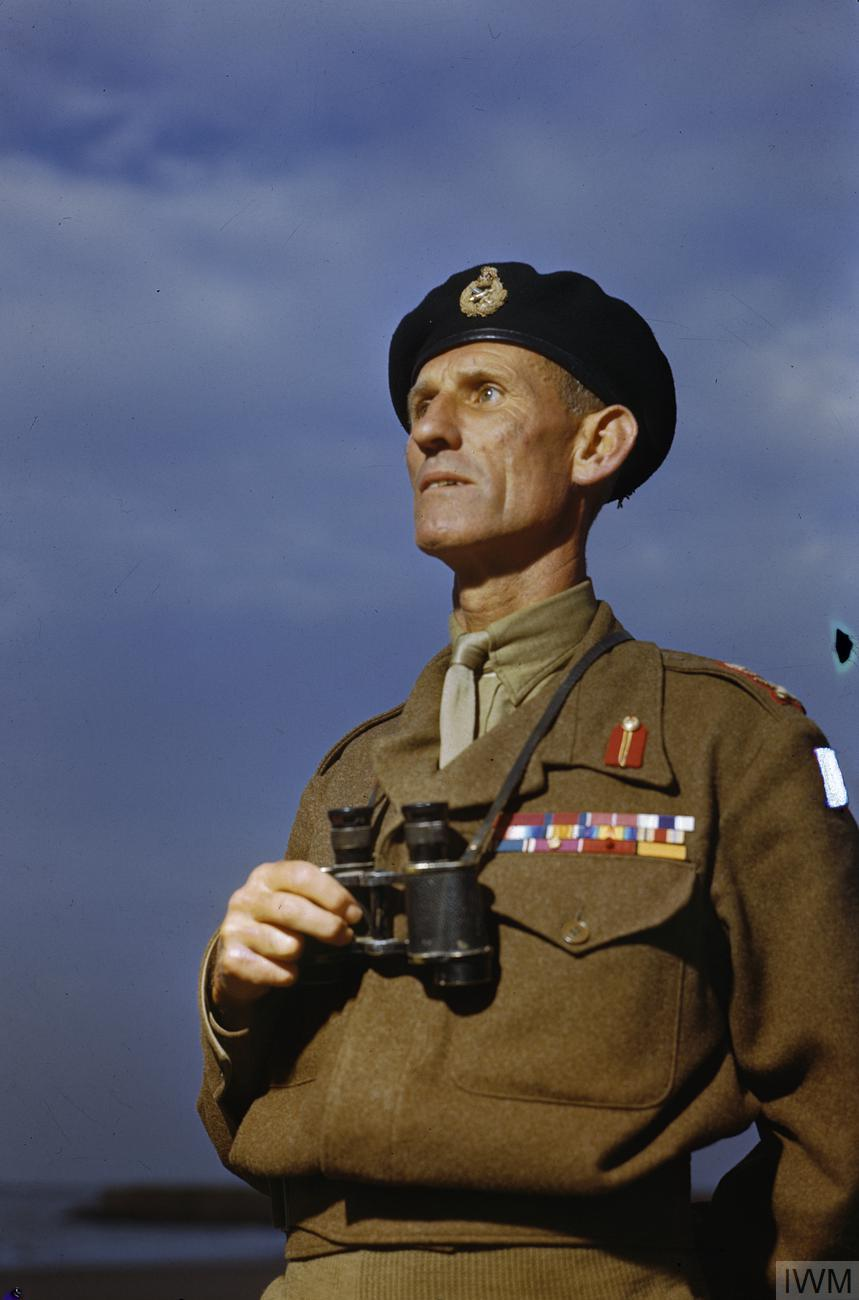
Lt-Gen Sir Richard McCreery

Army troops

7th Hussars (amphibious tanks)
12th Lancers (armoured cars)
16th Army Group Royal Engineers
20th Army Group Royal Engineers
22nd Army Group Royal Engineers
166th (Newfoundland) Field Artillery Regiment

===== V Corps =====
Lieutenant-General Charles Keightley

Corps troops

1st Army Group Royal Artillery (Five medium regiments)
2nd Army Group Royal Artillery (Five medium regiments)
6th Armoured Division Artillery
54th Super Heavy Regiment, Royal Artillery (less two batteries)

Special forces

Two squadrons Special Boat Service
Two troops Raiding Support Regiment
28th Brigade "Garibaldi" (Italian partisans)

56th Infantry Division
Major-General John Yeldham Whitfield

24th Guards Brigade
167th Infantry Brigade
169th Infantry Brigade
2nd Commando Brigade (under command)
9th Armoured Brigade (under command)
27th Lancers (armoured cars) (under command)
4th Hussars (Kangaroo armoured personnel carriers)

78th Infantry Division
Major-General Keith Arbuthnott

11th Infantry Brigade
36th Infantry Brigade
38th (Irish) Infantry Brigade
2nd Armoured Brigade (under command)

8th Indian Infantry Division
Major-General Dudley Russell

17th Indian Infantry Brigade
19th Indian Infantry Brigade
21st Indian Infantry Brigade
21st Army Tank Brigade (under command)

2nd New Zealand Division
Lieutenant-General Sir Bernard Freyberg, VC

4th New Zealand Armoured Brigade
5th New Zealand Infantry Brigade
6th New Zealand Infantry Brigade
9th New Zealand Infantry Brigade

Combat Group "Cremona" (Italian Co-belligerent Army)
Generale di Brigata Clemente Primieri

21st Infantry Regiment "Cremona"
22nd Infantry Regiment "Cremona"
7th Artillery Regiment "Cremona"

===== X Corps =====
Lieutenant-General John Hawkesworth

Jewish Brigade (from March 1945)

1st Battalion, Palestine Regiment
2nd Battalion, Palestine Regiment
3rd Battalion, Palestine Regiment
643 Field Company, Royal Engineers
200th Field Regiment, Royal Artillery

Combat Group "Friuli" (Italian Co-belligerent Army)
Generale di Brigata Arturo Scattini

87th Infantry Regiment "Friuli"
88th Infantry Regiment "Friuli"
35th Artillery Regiment "Friuli"

===== XIII Corps =====
Lieutenant-General Sir John Harding

6th Army Group Royal Artillery (under command)
10th Indian Infantry Division
Major-General Denys Reid

10th Indian Infantry Brigade
20th Indian Infantry Brigade
25th Indian Infantry Brigade
Lovat Scouts (under command)
2nd Battalion, Highland Light Infantry (under command)

Combat Group "Folgore" (Italian Co-belligerent Army)
Generale di Brigata Giorgio Morigi

Paratroopers Regiment "Nembo"
Navy Regiment "San Marco"
Artillery Regiment "Folgore"

===== Polish II Corps =====
Major-General Zygmunt Bohusz-Szyszko (acting commander)

Corps troops

Army Group Polish Artillery
54th Super Heavy Regiment Royal Artillery (one battery)
British 7th Armoured Brigade (under command)
43rd Gurkha Lorried Infantry Brigade (under command)
14th/20th Hussars (Kangaroo armoured personnel carriers) (under command)

3rd Carpathian Rifle Division
Major-General Bolesław Bronisław Duch

1st Carpathian Rifle Brigade
2nd Carpathian Rifle Brigade
3rd Carpathian Rifle Brigade
1st Carpathian Field Artillery Regiment
2nd Carpathian Field Artillery Regiment
3rd Carpathian Field Artillery Regiment
3rd Carpathian Anti-tank Artillery Regiment
3rd Carpathian Light Anti-aircraft Artillery Regiment
3rd Carpathian Medium Machinegun Battalion
3rd Carpathian Engineers Battalion

5th Kresowa Infantry Division
Major-General Nikodem Sulik

5th Wilenska Infantry Brigade
6th Lwowska Infantry Brigade
4th Wolwyn Infantry Brigade

2nd Armoured Brigade (Brigadier-General Bronislaw Rakowski)

===== Army Reserve =====
6th Armoured Division
Major-General Horatius Murray

26th Armoured Brigade
1st Guards Brigade
61st Infantry Brigade

25th Armoured Engineer Brigade (less detachments with assault divisions)
2nd Parachute Brigade

== Army Group C ==
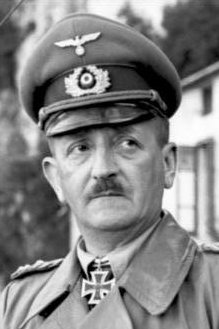
Gen. Heinrich von Vietinghoff

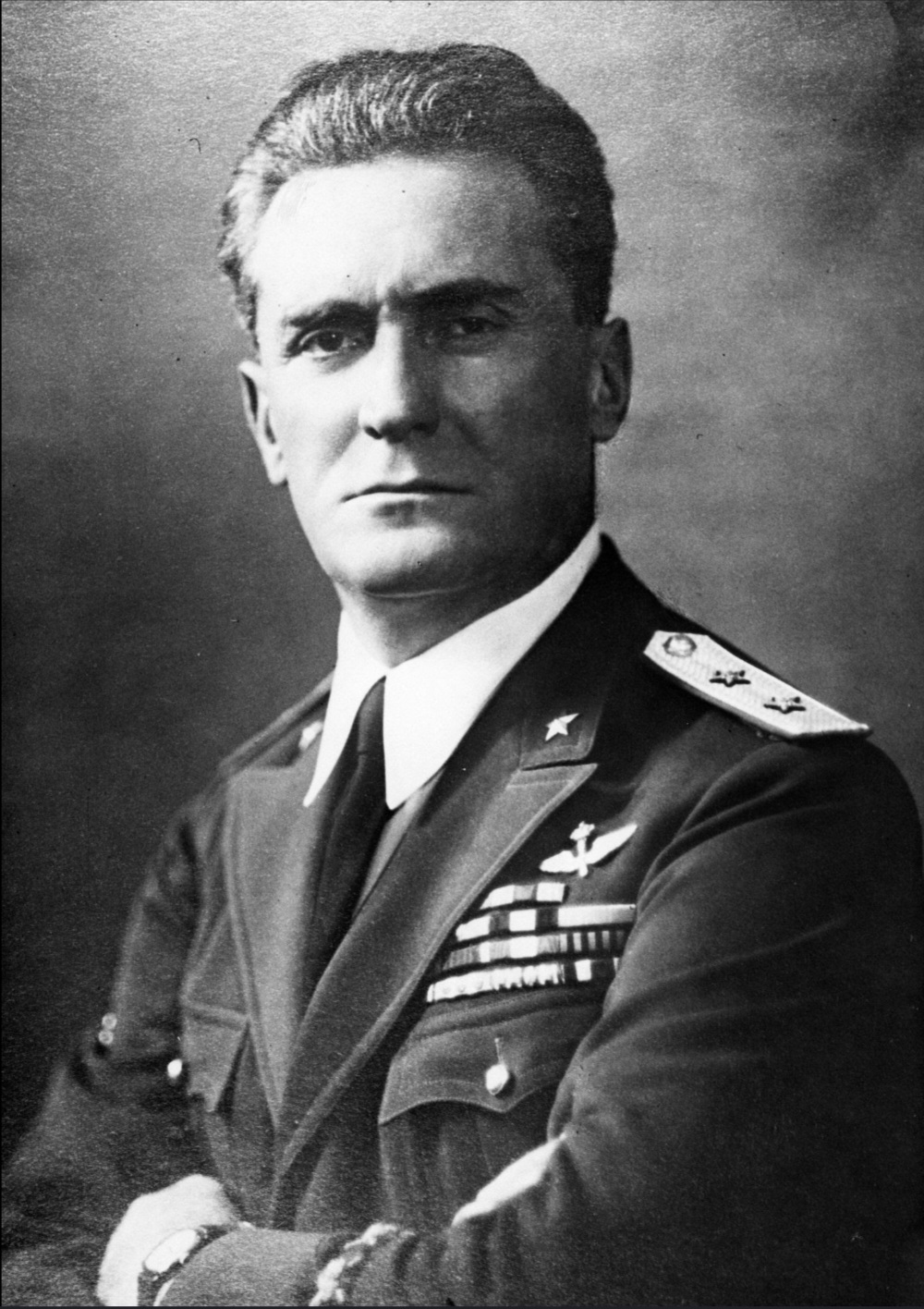
Marshal Rodolfo Graziani

=== Army Group C ===
Generaloberst Heinrich von Vietinghoff (to 29 April)
General der Infanterie Friedrich Schulz (from 29 April to 2 May)
Generaloberst Heinrich von Vietinghoff (from 2 May)

==== West: Army Group Liguria ====
Maresciallo Rodolfo Graziani

Lombardia Corps
Lieutenant-General Kurt Jahn

3rd Marine Infantry Division "San Marco" (Major-General Amilcare Farina)
Battle Group Meinhold

Fortress Brigade 135
Elements of the 4th Alpine Division "Monterosa"

LXXV Corps
General der Gebirgstruppe Hans Schlemmer

2nd Grenadier Division "Littorio" (Major-General Tito Agosti)
4th Alpine Division "Monterosa" (bulk of) (Colonel Giorgio Milazzo)
5th Mountain Division (Generalmajor Hans Steets)
34th Infantry Division (Generalleutnant Theobald Lieb)

==== Center: Fourteenth Army ====
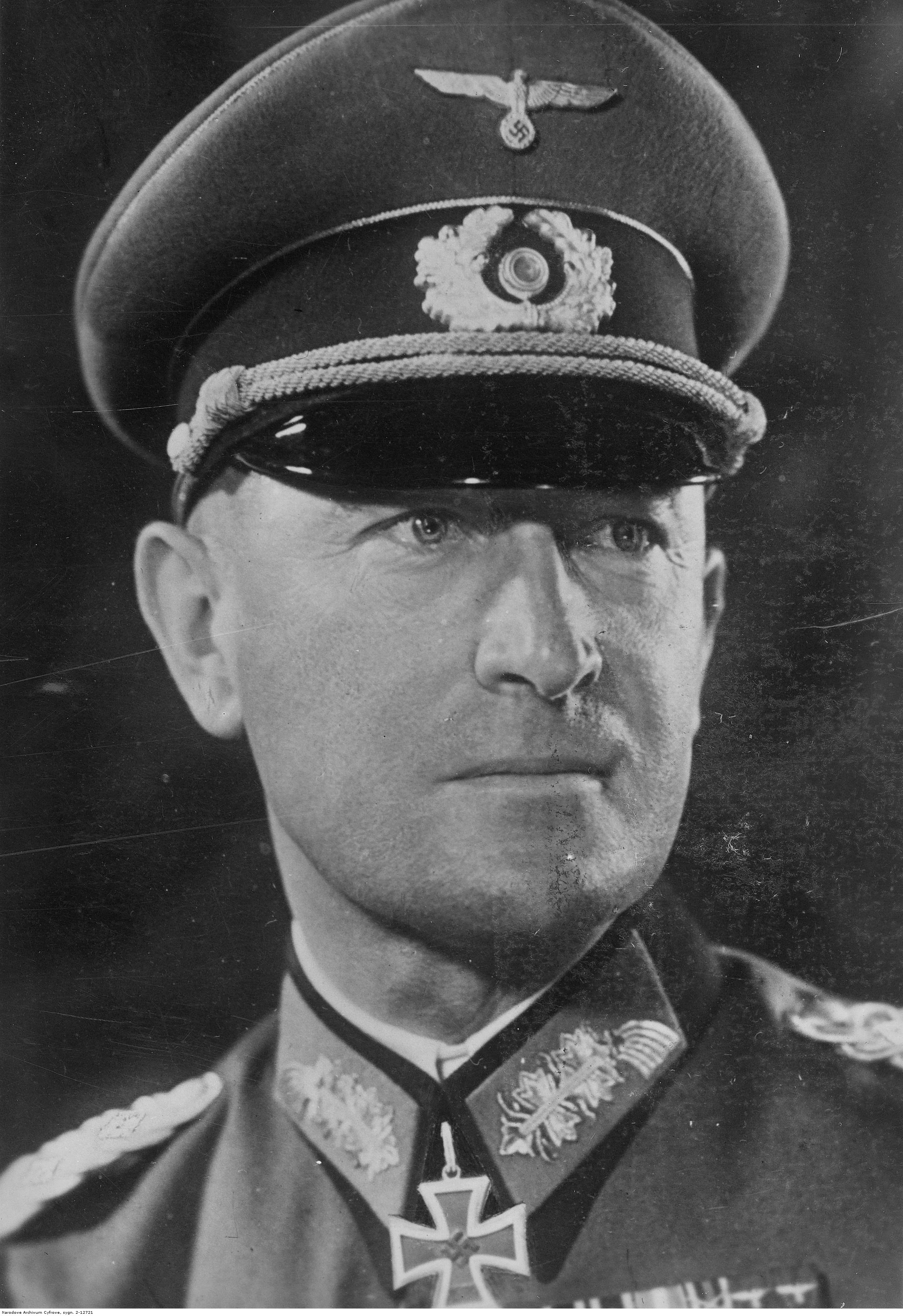
GnlLt Joachim Lemelsen

Generalleutnant Joachim Lemelsen

XIV Panzer Corps
Generalleutnant Frido von Senger und Etterlin

8th Mountain Division (Major-General Paul Schricker)
65th Infantry Division (Major-General Hellmuth Pfeifer)
94th Infantry Division (Major-General Bernhard Steinmetz)

LI Mountain Corps
Generalleutnant Valentin Feurstein until March 1945 and then Lieutenant-General Friedrich-Wilhelm Hauck

1st Bersaglieri Division "Italia" (Major-General Mario Carloni)
114th Jäger Division (Brigadier-General Hans-Joachim Ehlert to 15 April 1945 then Brigadier-General Martin Strahammer)
148th Reserve Division (Major-General Otto Fretter-Pico)
232nd Infantry Division (Major-General Eccard Freiherr von Gablenz)
334th Infantry Division (Major-General Hellmuth Böhlke)

==== East: Tenth Army ====
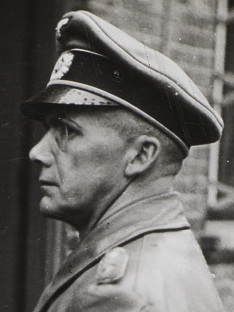
GnlLt Traugott Herr

Generalleutnant Traugott Herr

LXXVI Panzer Corps
Lieutenant-General Gerhard Graf von Schwerin (to 25 April 1945)
Major-General Karl von Graffen (from 25 April 1945)

42nd Jäger Division (Major-General Walter Jost)
98th Infantry Division (Major-General Alfred-Hermann Reinhardt to 11 April 1945 then Brigadier-General Otto Schiel)
162nd Turkoman Division (Major-General Ralph von Heygendorff)
362nd Infantry Division (Brigadier-General Alois Weber)

I Parachute Corps
Lieutenant-General Richard Heidrich

1st Parachute Division (Brigadier-General Karl-Lothar Schulz)
4th Parachute Division (Major-General Heinrich Trettner)
26th Panzer Division (Brigadier-General Alfred Kuhnert to 19 April 1945 then Major-General Viktor Linnarz)
278th Infantry Division (Major-General Harry Hoppe)

Italian "Forlì" Assault Battalion (Captain Pier Vittorio Riccardi)

305th Infantry Division (Major-General Friedrich von Schellwitz)

LXXIII Corps
Lieutenant-General Anton Dostler (Note: Executed by US for war crimes)

Minor units watching the coast between the Po and Venice

LXXXXVII Corps (transferred to Army Group E in Yugoslavia on 10 April)
General of the Mountain Troops Ludwig Kübler (Note: Executed by Yugoslavia for war crimes)

188th Mountain Division (Major-General Hans von Hößlin)
237th Infantry Division (Major-General Hans von Grävenitz until late April then Colonel Karl Falkner)

Army Reserve

29th Panzergrenadier Division (Major-General Fritz Polack)
155th Infantry Division (Brigadier-General Georg Zwade)

==== Army Group Reserve ====
90th Panzergrenadier Division (Brigadier-General Heinrich Baron von Behr)

== Sources ==
=== Print ===
- Blaxland, Gregory (1979). Alexander's Generals (the Italian Campaign 1944-1945). London: William Kimber & Co. ISBN 0-7183-0386-5.
- Carver, Field Marshal Lord (2001). The Imperial War Museum Book of the War in Italy 1943-1945. London: Sidgwick & Jackson. ISBN 0-330-48230-0.
- Jackson, General Sir William & Gleave, Group Captain T.P. (2004) [First. pub. HMSO:1987]. Butler, Sir James (ed.). The Mediterranean and Middle East, Volume VI: Victory in the Mediterranean, Part 2 - June to October 1944. History of the Second World War, United Kingdom Military Series. Uckfield, UK: Naval & Military Press. ISBN 1-84574-071-8.
- Jackson, General Sir William & Gleave, Group Captain T.P. (2004) [First. pub. HMSO:1988]. Butler, Sir James (ed.). The Mediterranean and Middle East, Volume VI: Victory in the Mediterranean, Part 3 - November 1944 to May 1945. History of the Second World War, United Kingdom Military Series. Uckfield, UK: Naval & Military Press. ISBN 1-84574-072-6.
- Kay, Robin (1967). "Appendix VII — Fifteenth Army Group — Order of Battle as at 9 April 1945". Italy Volume II : From Cassino to Trieste. The Official History of New Zealand in the Second World War 1939–1945. Wellington, New Zealand: Historical Publications Branch.

=== Web ===
- Houterman, Hans; Koppes, Jeroen. "World War II unit histories and officers". Archived from the original on 3 December 2008.
- "Orders of Battle.com". Archived from the original on 17 July 2007.
- Wendell, Marcus. "Axis History Factbook: German army order of battle". Archived from the original on 29 October 2006.
