= Gothic Line order of battle =

World War II order of battle

Gothic Line order of battle is a listing of the significant formations that were involved in Operation Olive, the Allied offensive on the Gothic Line in northern Italy, August–September 1944, and in the subsequent fighting in the central Apennine Mountains and on the plains of eastern Emilia-Romagna up to April 1945.

== Allied Forces Headquarters Mediterranean ==
Supreme Allied Commander Mediterranean:

General Sir Henry Maitland Wilson (until 12 December 1944)
Field Marshal Sir Harold Alexander (from 12 December 1944)

Deputy Supreme Allied Commander Mediterranean:

Lieutenant General Jacob L. Devers (until September 1944)
Lieutenant General Joseph T. McNarney (from September 1944)

Chief of Staff

Lieutenant-General Sir James Gammell (to 12 December 1944)
Lieutenant-General Sir John Harding (from 12 December 1944 to 6 March 1945)
Lieutenant-General William Morgan (from 6 March 1945)

=== Allied Armies in Italy (until 12 December 1944) ===
Commander-in-chief: General Sir Harold Alexander

Chief of Staff: Lieutenant-General Sir John Harding

=== Allied 15th Army Group (from 12 December 1944) ===
Commander: Lieutenant General Mark W. Clark (promoted to full general 10 March 1945)

Chief of Staff: Major General Alfred Gruenther

==== U.S. Fifth Army ====
Commander:

Lieutenant General Mark W. Clark (until 16 December 1944)
Lieutenant General Lucian Truscott (from 16 December 1944)

===== U.S. II Corps =====
Major General Geoffrey Keyes
- U.S. 34th Infantry Division (Major General Charles L. Bolte)
- U.S. 88th Infantry Division (Major General Paul W. Kendall)
- U.S. 91st Infantry Division (Major General William G. Livesay)
- U.S. 85th Infantry Division (Major General John B. Coulter) (until April 1945 when transferred to IV Corps)
- Italian Combat Group "Legnano" (from 1945)

===== U.S. IV Corps =====
Major General Willis D. Crittenberger
- U.S. 1st Armored Division (Major General Vernon Prichard)
- 6th South African Armoured Division (Major-General Evered Poole)
- U.S. 92nd Infantry Division (Major General Edward Almond) (from August 1944)*
- 1st Brazilian Infantry Division (General Mascarenhas de Morais) (from November 1944)
- U.S. 10th Mountain Division (Major General George Price Hays) (from February 1945)
- U.S. 85th Infantry Division (Major-General John B. Coulter) (transferred from II Corps April 1945)

* Order of entry into battle

===== British XIII Corps (transferred to British Eighth Army in January 1945) =====
Lieutenant-General Sidney Kirkman (until 25 January 1945)
Lieutenant-General John Harding (from 25 January 1945)
- 6th Army Group Royal Artillery
- British 4th Infantry Division (Major-General Alfred Dudley Ward) (until September 1944)
  - 10th Infantry Brigade
  - 12th Infantry Brigade
  - 28th Infantry Brigade
- British 6th Armoured Division (Major-General Horatius Murray) (from August 1944 to March 1945)
  - 26th Armoured Brigade
  - 1st Guards Brigade
  - 61st Infantry Brigade
- 8th Indian Infantry Division (Major-General Dudley Russell) (until March 1945)
  - 17th Indian Infantry Brigade
  - 19th Indian Infantry Brigade
  - 21st Indian Infantry Brigade
- 10th Indian Infantry Division (Major-General Denys Whitehorn Reid) (from February 1945)
  - 10th Indian Infantry Brigade
  - 20th Indian Infantry Brigade
  - 25th Indian Infantry Brigade
- 1st Canadian Armoured Brigade (until February 1945)
- British 1st Infantry Division (Major-General Charles Loewen) (until January 1945)
  - 2nd Infantry Brigade
  - 3rd Infantry Brigade
  - 66th Infantry Brigade

===== Independent units under Army HQ =====
- Brazilian Expeditionary Force (General Mascarenhas de Moraes) (from November 1944)
- U.S. 92nd Infantry Division (Major-General Edward M. Almond) (from November 1944)

==== British Eighth Army ====
Commander:

Lieutenant-General Sir Oliver Leese (until 1 October 1944)
Lieutenant-General Sir Richard L. McCreery (from 1 October 1944)

===== British V Corps =====
Lieutenant-General Charles Keightley
- 1st Army Group Royal Artillery
- British 1st Armoured Division (Major-General Richard Hull) (until 25 September 1944)
  - 2nd Armoured Brigade
  - 18th Infantry Brigade
  - 43rd Gurkha Lorried Infantry Brigade
- British 4th Infantry Division (Major-General Alfred Dudley Ward) (from October to November 1944)
  - 10th Infantry Brigade
  - 12th Infantry Brigade
  - 28th Infantry Brigade
- 4th Indian Infantry Division (Major-General Arthur Holworthy) (until October 1944)
  - 5th Indian Infantry Brigade
  - 7th Indian Infantry Brigade
  - 11th Indian Infantry Brigade
- British 46th Infantry Division (Major-General John Hawkesworth until 6 November 1944, then Major-General Stephen Weir) (until December 1944)
  - 128th Infantry Brigade
  - 138th Infantry Brigade
  - 139th Infantry Brigade
  - British 25th Tank Brigade
- British 56th Infantry Division (Major-General John Whitfield)
  - 167th Infantry Brigade
  - 168th Infantry Brigade
  - 169th Infantry Brigade
  - British 7th Armoured Brigade
- British 78th Infantry Division (Major-General Donald Butterworth until 10 October 1944 and then Major-General Keith Arbuthnott) (from March 1945)
  - 11th Infantry Brigade
  - 36th Infantry Brigade
  - 38th Infantry Brigade
- British 6th Armoured Division (Major-General Horatius Murray) (from 18–23 April 1945)
- 8th Indian Infantry Division (Major-General Dudley Russell) (from March 1945)
- 10th Indian Infantry Division (Major-General Denys Reid) (from October 1944 to February 1945)
- 2nd New Zealand Division (Lieutenant-General Sir Bernard C. Freyburg) (November 1944 to 14 April 1945)
  - 4th New Zealand Armoured Brigade
  - 5th New Zealand Infantry Brigade
  - 6th New Zealand Infantry Brigade
- Jewish Brigade (from February to March 1945)
- Italian Liberation Corps (1944)
  - 184th Infantry Division "Nembo"
  - I Brigade
  - II Brigade
- Italian Combat Group "Cremona" (from 1945)
- Italian 28th Brigade "Garibaldi" (from 1945)

===== British X Corps (until December 1944 and from February 1945) =====
Lieutenant-General Sir Richard McCreery (until 6 November 1944)
Lieutenant-General John Hawkesworth (from 6 November 1944)
- 2nd Army Group Royal Artillery
- 10th Indian Infantry Division (Major-General Denys Whitehorn Reid) (until October 1944)
  - 10th Indian Infantry Brigade
  - 20th Indian Infantry Brigade
  - 25th Indian Infantry Brigade
- British 9th Armoured Brigade
- Jewish Brigade (from March 1945)
- Italian Combat Group "Friuli" (from 1945)

===== British XIII Corps (transferred from U.S. Fifth Army January 1945) =====
see listing above under U.S. Fifth Army)

===== Canadian I Corps (until February 1945) =====
Lieutenant-General E. L. M. Burns (until 10 November 1944)
Lieutenant-General Charles Foulkes (from 10 November 1944)
- First Canadian Army Group Royal Canadian Artillery
- Canadian 1st Infantry Division (Major-General Chris Vokes until 1 December 1944 then Major-General H. W. Foster)
  - 1st Canadian Infantry Brigade
  - 2nd Canadian Infantry Brigade
  - 3rd Canadian Infantry Brigade
- Canadian 5th Armoured Division (Major-General Bert Hoffmeister)
  - 5th Canadian Armoured Brigade
  - 11th Canadian Infantry Brigade
  - 12th Canadian Infantry Brigade
- British 7th Armoured Brigade
- British 21st Tank Brigade
- British 4th Infantry Division (Major-General Dudley Ward) (from September to October 1944)
- 2nd New Zealand Division (Lieutenant-General Sir Bernard Freyberg. Major-General C. E. Weir acting commander 3 September to 17 October 1944) (September to October 1944)
- 3rd Greek Mountain Brigade (Colonel Thrasyvoulos Tsakalotos) (from September to October 1944)

===== Polish II Corps =====
Lieutenant-General Władysław Anders
- Army Group Polish Artillery
- Polish 3rd Carpathian Rifle Division (Major-General Bolesław Bronisław Duch)
  - 1st Carpathian Rifle Brigade
  - 2nd Carpathian Rifle Brigade
- Polish 5th Kresowa Infantry Division (Major-General Nikodem Sulik)
  - 5th Wilenska Infantry Brigade
  - 6th Lwowska Infantry Brigade
- Polish 2nd Armoured Brigade (Brigadier-General Bronislaw Rakowski)

===== Other Units =====
- British 2nd Commando Brigade (Brigadier Ronnie Tod) (1945)
- British 2nd Parachute Brigade (Brigadier Charles Pritchard) (to December 1944)

== German Army Group C ==
Commander:

Field Marshal Albert Kesselring (until 25 October 1944, from January 1945 until 9 March 1945)
General Heinrich von Vietinghoff (from 25 October 1944 until January 1945 and from 9 March 1945)

=== Tenth Army ===
Commander:

General Heinrich von Vietinghoff (until 25 October 1944)
Lieutenant-General Joachim Lemelsen (from 25 October 1944 to 15 February 1945)
Lieutenant-General Traugott Herr (from 15 February 1945)

==== LXXVI Panzer Corps ====
Lieutenant-General Traugott Herr (until 26 December 1944)
Lieutenant-General Gerhard Graf von Schwerin (from 26 December 1944 to 25 April 1945)
Major-General Karl von Graffen (from 25 April 1945)
- 1st Parachute Division (Lieutenant-General Richard Heidrich until 18 November 1944 then Brigadier Karl-Lothar Schulz)
- 5th Mountain Division (Major-General Max-Günther Schrank to 18 January 1945, then Major-General Hans Steets)
- 71st Infantry Division (Major-General Wilhelm Raapke) (until December 1944)
- 162nd Infantry Division (Major-General Ralph von Heygendorff)
- 278th Infantry Division (Major-General Harry Hoppe)

==== LI Mountain Corps ====
Lieutenant-General Valentin Feurstein until March 1945 and then Lieutenant-General Friedrich-Wilhelm Hauck
- 44th Reichsgrenadier Division Hoch und Deutschmeister (Major-General Hans-Günther von Rost) (until November 1944)
- 114th Jäger Division (Brigadier-General Hans-Joachim Ehlert to 15 April 1945 then Brigadier-General Martin Strahammer)
- 232nd Infantry Division (Lieutenant-General Eccard Freiherr von Gablenz)
- 305th Infantry Division (Lieutenant-General Friedrich-Wilhelm Hauck until Dec 1944 then Brigadier-General Friedrich von Schellwitz)
- 334th Infantry Division (Major-General Hellmuth Böhlke)
- 715th Infantry Division (Brigadier-General Hanns von Rohr) (until January 1945)
- Italian 1st "Italia" Bersaglieri Division (Major-General Mario Carloni)

=== Fourteenth Army ===
Commander:
Lieutenant-General Joachim Lemelsen (to 24 October 1944 and from 17 February 1945)
Lieutenant-General Frido von Senger und Etterlin (October 1944)
Lieutenant-General Heinz Ziegler (24 October to 22 November 1944)
Lieutenant-General Traugott Herr (22 November to 12 December 1944)
Lieutenant-General Kurt von Tippelskirch (from 12 December 1944 to 16 February 1945)

==== I Parachute Corps ====
Lieutenant-General Alfred Schlemm (to 30 September 1944)
Lieutenant-General Richard Heidrich (from 1 November 1944 to 23 January 1945)
Major-General Hellmuth Böhlke (from 23 January 1945 to 7 February 1945)
Lieutenant-General Richard Heidrich (from 7 February 1945)
- 4th Parachute Division (Major-General Heinrich Trettner)
- 356th Infantry Division (Major-General Karl Faulenbach to October 1944)
- 362nd Infantry Division (Major-General Heinz Greiner)

==== XIV Panzer Corps ====
General der Panzertruppe Frido(lin) von Senger und Etterlin
- 26th Panzer Division (Major-General Eduard Crasemann to 29 January 1945 then Major-General Alfred Kuhnert to 19 April 1945 then Major-General Viktor Linnarz)
- 65th Infantry Division (Lieutenant-General Hellmuth Pfeifer (kia 22 April 1945))
- 16th SS Panzergrenadier Division Reichsführer-SS (SS-Gruppenführer Max Simon until 24 October 1944 then SS-Brigadeführer Otto Baum)

=== Army Group Liguria ===
Commander: Marshal Rodolfo Graziani
- Italian 3rd "San Marco" Marine Division (Major-General Amilcare Farina)
- Italian 4th "Monterosa" Alpine Division (Colonel Giorgio Milazzo)
- 42nd Jäger Division (Major-General Walter Jost)
- 34th Infantry Division (Major-General Theobald Lieb)

=== Army Reserve ===
- 29th Panzergrenadier Division (Major-General Fritz Polack)
- 20th Luftwaffe Field Division re-designated 20th Luftwaffe Sturm Division in June 1944 (Brigadier-General Wilhelm Crisolli until 1 June 1944 then Brigadier-General Erich Fronhöfer)

=== Independent Units ===
==== LXXV Corps (Italian–French border) ====
Lieutenant-General Hans Schlemmer
- 148th Reserve Division (Major-General Otto Schönherr) (to August 1944)
- 90th Panzergrenadier Division (Major-General Ernst-Günther Baade to 9 December 1944 then Lieutenant-General Gerhard von Schwerin to 26 December 1944 then Brigadier-General Heinrich Baron von Behr)
- 157th Mountain Division re-designated 8th Mountain Division in February 1945 (Major-General Paul Schricker)
- Italian 2nd "Littorio" Grenadier Division (Major-General Tito Agosti)

==== Adriatic Coast Command ====
- 94th Infantry Division (Major-General Bernhard Steinmetz)
- 188th Mountain Division (Major-General Hans von Hößlin)
