= Battle of Collecchio =

Conflict in World War II

- Part of the Spring 1945 offensive in Italy during World War II
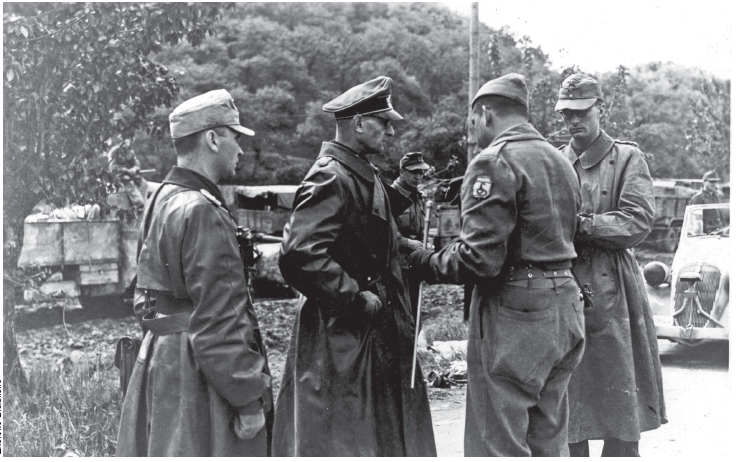
- German Colonel Otto von Kleiber in preliminary discussions with Brazilian Major Franco Ferreira in Fornovo di Taro regarding the surrender of the German 148th Infantry Division on 29 April 1945.
Date	26–29 April 1945 (3 days)
Location	Collecchio and Fornovo di Taro, Italian Social Republic 44.749659°N 10.215569°E
Result	Allied victory

Belligerents
Germany; Italian Social Republic	(Vargas Era) Brazil; Italian partisans; United States

Commanders and leaders
Otto Fretter-Pico (surrendered); Mario Carloni (surrendered)	Mascarenhas de Morais; Zenóbio da Costa; Orlando Gomes Ramagem; Federico Salvestri; Edward Almond

Units involved
(Nazi Germany) 148th Infantry Division (Nazi Germany) 90th Panzergrenadier Division; 29th Waffen Grenadier Division of the SS (1st Italian) (Italian Social Republic) 1st Bersaglieri "Italia" Division (Italian Social Republic) 4th Alpini "Monte Rosa" Division	(Vargas Era) 1st Infantry Division (FEB) (Vargas Era) 1st Connection and Observation Squadron; Italian Partisan formations (United States) 751st Tank Battalion (attached) (United States) 894th Tank Battalion (attached)

Strength
~15,500 troops	~10,000 troops

Casualties and losses
~500 dead and wounded 14,700–15,500 captured	(Vargas Era) 45 dead and wounded Unknown (United States) Unknown
- Location of Fornovo di Taro in Italy's Po Valley

The Battle of Collecchio-Fornovo (26–29 April 1945) was a battle of the Second World War fought between the Brazilian Expeditionary Force (Força Expedicionária Brasileira – FEB) and Italian partisans, with supporting armor attachments from the American 1st Armored and 92nd Infantry Divisions, against the retreating Axis forces of the Wehrmacht's 148th Infantry Division, 90th Panzergrenadier Division, and the fascist National Republican Army's 1st Bersaglieri "Italia" and 4th Alpini "Monte Rosa" Divisions. The battle took place around the towns of Collecchio and Fornovo di Taro, approximately 13 kilometres (8.1 mi) southwest of Parma, Italy. The Allied forces successfully enveloped and defeated the Axis troops attempting to break out to the north.

On 28 April, the Brazilian 6th Regimental Combat Team launched a decisive attack on Fornovo di Taro. German General Otto Fretter-Pico surrendered the 148th Division, along with remnants of accompanying German and Fascist Italian formations comprising nearly 15,000 troops, on the morning of 29 April.

== Background of main forces ==
=== 1st Brazilian (Expeditionary) Infantry Division ===
The Brazilian Expeditionary Division was commanded by General João Baptista Mascarenhas de Morais. The FEB arrived in Italy in the latter part of 1944, at a time when Allied troops were being transferred from Italy to take part in operations in southern France.

On 16 July 1944, the 6th RCT reached Naples, the first of five contingents sent by Brazil. These troops were formed into a RCT under Brigadier General Euclides Zenóbio da Costa. With three U.S. tank companies as reinforcements, the 6th RCT moved to the front in September 1944, pursuing German units that were making a tactical retreat to the Gothic Line.

In October–November 1944, the 6th RCT fought several engagements, but were unable to break through the Gothic line positions before the winter snows. The 1st and 11th RCT arrived in November, bringing the FEB up to division strength. At its peak, the Brazilian division had a total of 25,334 men in the 1st, 6th and 11th RCTs. Each RCT had three battalions of four companies.

In February 1945, as part of the Battle of Mount Belvedere the Brazilians overcame the German defenders of the strong Monte Castello position. They then moved eastward, fighting at Roncovecchio, Seneveglio and Castelnuovo. The Brazilian division fought a tough four-day battle for Montese, which was taken on 16 April. Turning north, in the early morning of 21 April Brazilian forces conquered and occupied Zocca, an important rail terminal in the region, and by 22 April the FEB had broken into the Po Valley, pursuing the fleeing German forces. General Zenóbio da Costa took the vehicles from 10 of his 12 artillery batteries for use in infantry transport, creating a mobile force with 606 jeeps and 676 trucks of different types. On the morning of 26 April, Brazilian forces were consolidating the defenses of Parma, when they heard that German units were approaching from the south.

=== German 148th Infantry Division ===
On 25 September 1943, General Otto Fretter-Pico took command of the 148th Infantry Division and led it for the rest of the war. In August 1944, the division was in action against the Allied Operation Dragoon, the invasion of southern France. In late October 1944, the division was transferred to northern Italy. In December 1944, the 148th Division struck decisively against Allied positions in the Apennine Mountains in Operation Wintergewitter (Winter storm), causing serious disruption despite being outnumbered and inferior in weapons to the Allies.

However, by the end of March the German army was in an impossible situation. It suffered from an acute lack of supplies, total domination of the skies by Allied air forces, and large and rapidly growing partisan forces. By 23 April, the situation for German forces in Italy was desperate. The partisans had taken Parma, Fiume had been occupied by Tito's Yugoslav forces and French units had entered Italy from the west. The 148th Division, which had been based around the Gulf of Genoa, made a last effort to break out to the north across the Po Valley.

== Battle ==
=== Collecchio ===
On news of the German-Italian forces approach, retreating from the Genoa-La Spezia region, which had been liberated by Allied forces, including the US 92nd Division, a Brazilian armored reconnaissance squadron moved south from Parma, meeting leading units of the Axis forces in Collecchio. They first met armored cars from the 90th Panzergrenadier Division's reconnaissance unit, and then tanks (of the same division) with infantry from the 281st Regiment of the 148th Infantry Division. The reconnaissance squadron called for reinforcements. According to Captain Pitaluga of the reconnaissance troop, "I arrived in Collecchio at noon, and I was alone until 6 pm. I had already occupied almost half the town when the infantry arrived." Pitaluga's unit of M8 cars fought it out against more lightly armored German vehicles, which only had 20 mm cannons. However, the Brazilian armored cars were vulnerable to tanks and anti-tank weapons; Pitaluga said of his vehicles, "The M8 is for recon, not (for heavy) combat.". Like the M10 (another vehicle used then by Brazilian supporting units of Cavalry), M8 had open-topped turrets, which made them more vulnerable (than fully enclosed tanks) to anti-tank infantry close attacks, especially in urban combat, as was the case at Collecchio. Also, in this first day of the battle, the Brazilians were outnumbered by a German battalion with two or three squadrons.

A force of Brazilian infantry was hastily ferried to the town in jeeps, trucks (like M3s), and the transport sent back for more. By 18:30 on 26 April, the Brazilian infantry was in place and prepared for action. This included 5th Company, II Battalion, 11th Infantry; a machine gun platoon from 8th Company, 11th Infantry; and 9th Company, III Battalion, 6th RCT. Major Orlando Gomez Ramagem, commander of II Battalion, 11th Infantry was given command of the Brazilian forces. With the war clearly drawing to a close, the troops may have been reluctant to take unnecessary risks. At first, Major Ramagem was in favor of encamping for the night, but he was dissuaded by the Brazilian divisional commander, General Mascarenhas de Moraes. According to one source, "The old general acted with the enthusiasm of a lieutenant."

Ramagem ordered some of his troops, supported by the machine guns, to dig in to block Highway 62, which led north to Parma. The 5th company of the 11th RCT was ordered to attack at 19:30. The first attacks were made from the southeast by this company, which quickly captured the church. This was followed by attacks from the northeast by a company of the 6th RCT. German infantry defending the outskirts of the town, supported by mortars, responded to the attacks with intense fire. Neither the Brazilians nor the Germans had any regular artillery. The Germans had only mortar and rifle fire.

The church was used to hold German prisoners, and the church tower as an observation post. Lt. Jairo Junqueira da Silva of the 11th Infantry recounts an incident when General Zenóbio da Costa appeared unexpectedly at the church:

That Zenóbio was crazy. We were close to the church door, and suddenly Zenóbio appeared, from heaven knows where. It was rather crowded, and I had the mortars in position in front of the church. Suddenly, here comes a German patrol in front of the garden, under cover of the vegetation. They were only a short distance away, and the guys started shooting. The first thing you have to do is hit the dust, but Zenóbio stood there as if he was a squad leader, and began issuing orders – 'Riflemen, here! Sergeant, go there!'... Like everyone else, I was lying down, with that machine gun firing close. But he didn't move, didn't lie down, did nothing of the sort.

More Brazilian troops from 2nd Company, I Battalion, 6th RCT arrived at 21:00, some riding on Brazilian-operated M10 and M4 Sherman tanks, to enter the fight. The Axis troops made several unsuccessful attempts to break through to the north, but by 02:00 on 27 April, Allied forces had penetrated into the town. The Axis forces, reinforced by artillery and some tanks made a final desperate assault just before dawn. When this failed, their resistance collapsed. By noon Allied forces, with Brazilians ahead, had full control of the town, forcing the Germans and Fascist Italians south toward Fornovo by late afternoon on 27 April.

=== Fornovo di Taro ===
Prisoners taken in the battle at Collecchio confirmed partisans and Rebels' reports that the 148th Division had come from the Gulf of Genoa and was in the area surrounding Fornovo di Taro about 14 miles (23 km) to the southwest of Collecchio on Highway 62. The German 148th Infantry Division made an attempt to halt the Allies at Fornovo di Taro. The Allied forces attacked this position at 18:00 on 28 April. The defeat at Collecchio and follow-up attacks in Fornovo convinced the German commander that defeat was inevitable. At 22:00, General Otto Fretter-Pico sent emissaries seeking a cease fire while terms were discussed. On 29 April, he surrendered the 148th Division intact.

== Aftermath ==
The Brazilian commander, General Mascarenhas de Moraes, received the surrender of the Wehrmacht and ENR Divisions on 29 April 1945. In one week the Brazilians had taken 14,700 troops, 800 officers and two generals. The Brazilians also took 1,500 vehicles and 80 guns. All Axis forces in Italy capitulated on 2 May 1945.

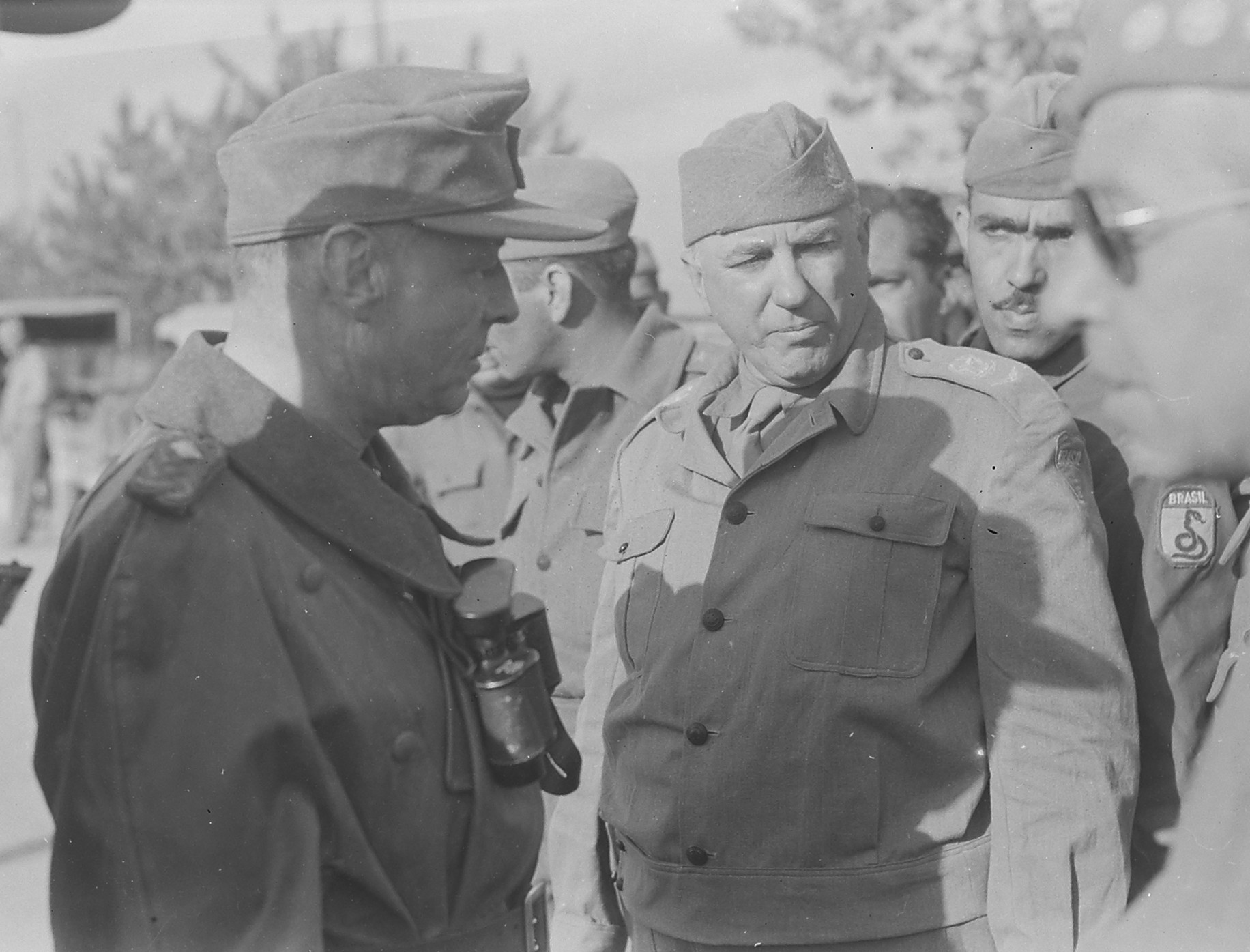
Generalleutnant Otto Fretter-Pico (left) surrendering to General Olímpio Falconière da Cunha (center).

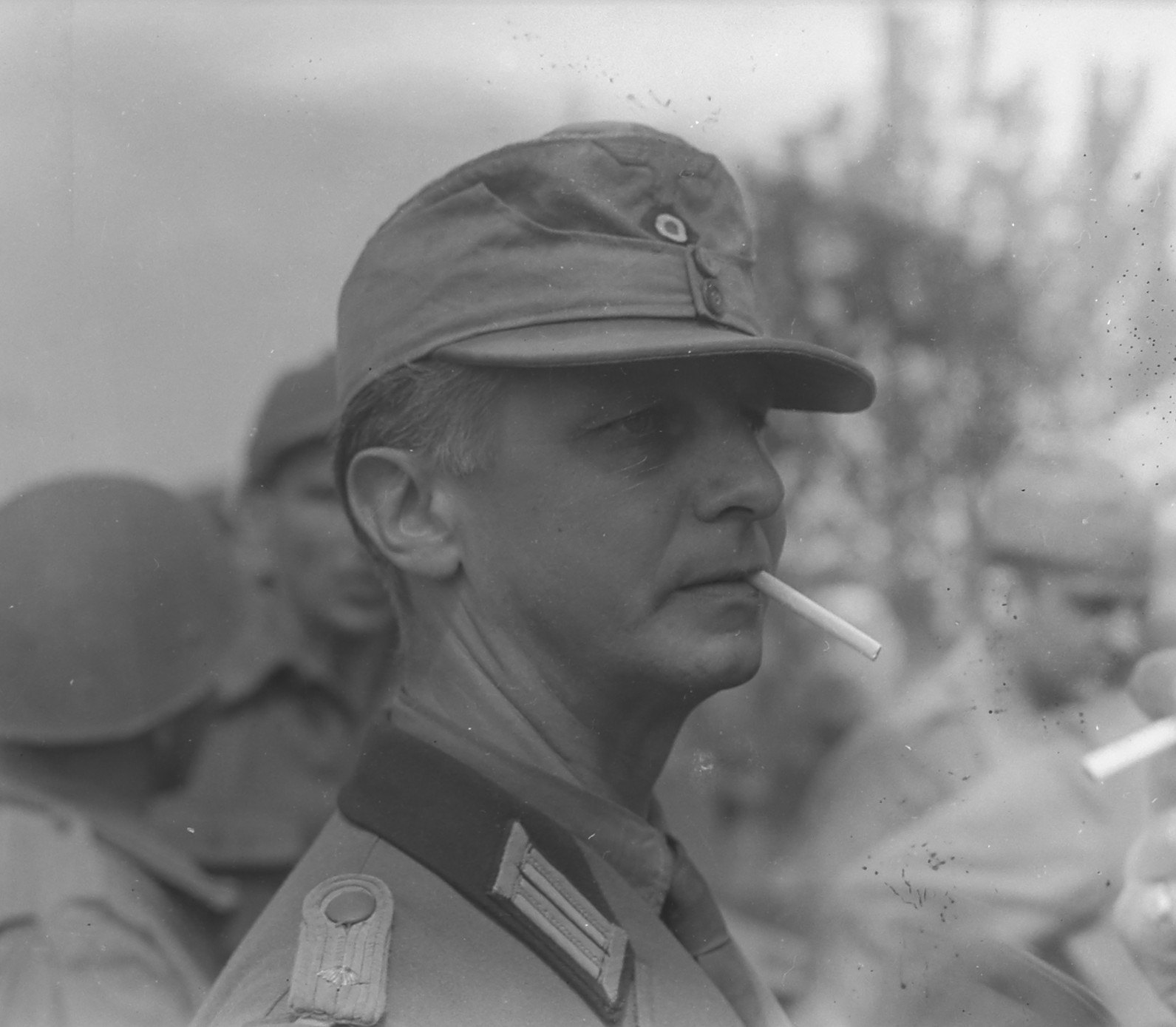
German soldier of the 148th during the surrender.

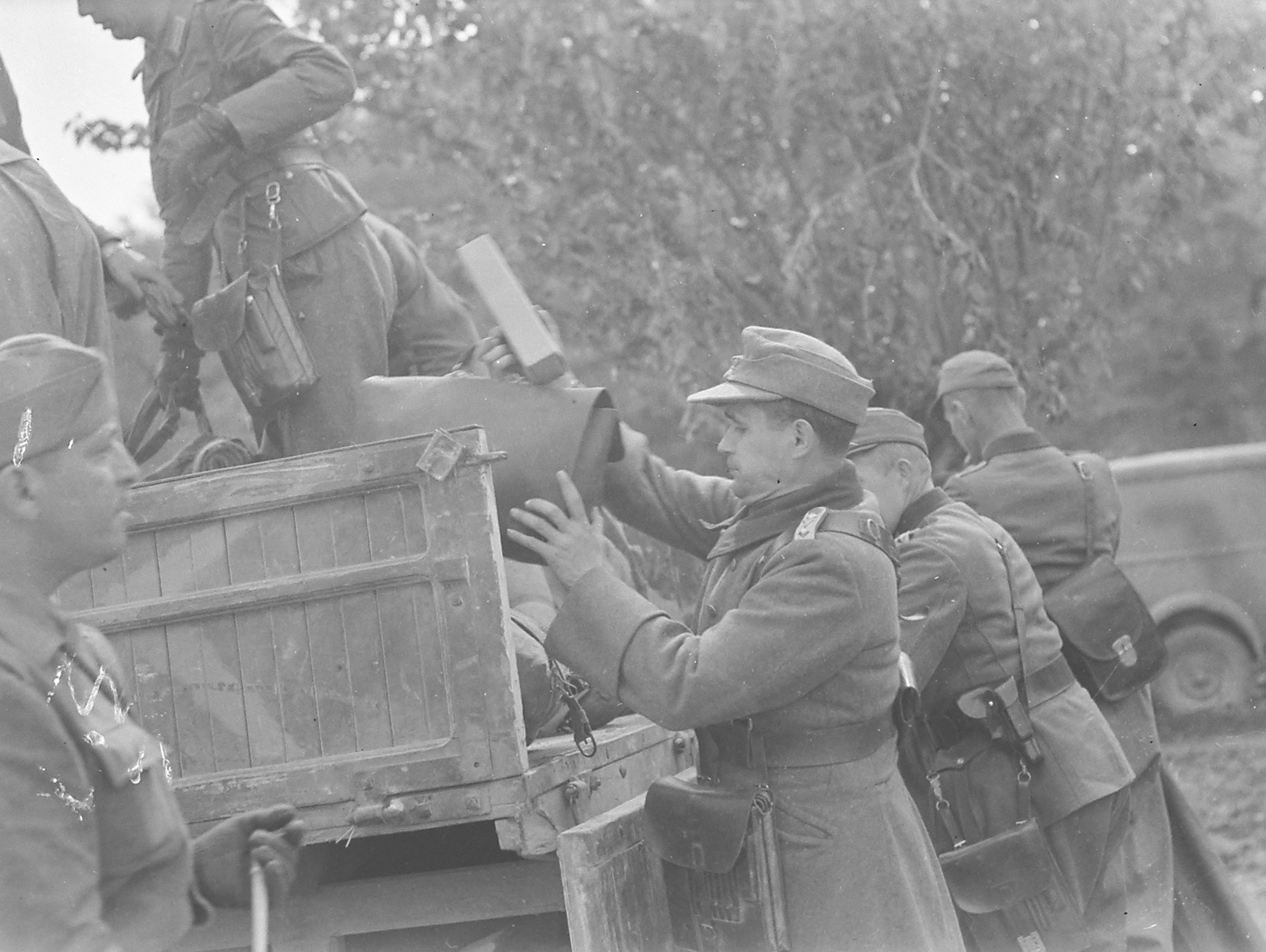
German soldiers loading a vehicle during the surrender.

== Bibliography ==
- Baber, Richard (2008). "The Battle at Collecchio" (PDF). The Journal. The Society of Twentieth Century Wargamers. Archived from the original (PDF) on 3 March 2014.
- Bohmler, Rudolf (1964). Monte Cassino: a German View. Cassell. ASIN B000MMKAYM.
- Camel, Ken; Forsey, Jonathan; Turner, Wayne (19 October 2011). "The Cobra is Smokin'". Flames of War.
- Chase, Patrick J. (1995). Seek, Strike, Destroy: the History of the 894th Tank Destroyer Battalion in World War II. Gateway Press.
- Donato, Hernâni (1996). Dicionário das Batalhas Brasileiras ('Dictionary of Brazilian Battles') (in Portuguese) (2nd ed.). Ibrasa. ISBN 8534800340.
- Dulles, John W. F. (1978). Castello Branco: the making of a Brazilian president. Texas A&M University Press. ISBN 978-0-89096-043-1.
- Edwards, Paul M. (24 August 2010). Between the Lines of World War II: Twenty-One Remarkable People and Events. McFarland. ISBN 978-0-7864-4667-4.
- Fisher, Ernest F. Jr. (16 November 1993). Mediterranean Theater of Operations: Cassino to the Alps (Paperback). Government Printing Office. ISBN 978-0-16-061310-4.
- Gibran, Daniel K. (2001). The 92nd Infantry Division and the Italian Campaign in World War II. McFarland & Co. Inc. Publishers. ISBN 0786410094.
- Hargrove, Hondon B. (1985). Buffalo Soldiers in Italy: Black Americans in World War II (1st ed.). McFarland & Co. Inc., Publishers. ISBN 0786417080.
- Maximiano, Cesar Campiani (20 December 2011). Brazilian Expeditionary Force in World War II. Osprey Publishing. ISBN 978-1-78096-285-6.
- Mitcham, Samuel W. (30 January 2007). Retreat to the Reich: The German Defeat in France, 1944. Stackpole Books. ISBN 978-0-8117-3384-7.
- Moraes, João Baptista Mascarenhas de (1966). The Brazilian Expeditionary Force by its commander. U.S. Govt. Print. Off.
- Moseley, Ray (2004). Mussolini: The Last 600 Days of Il Duce. Taylor Trade Publications. ISBN 978-1-58979-095-7.
- Neto, Ricardo; Maximiano, Cesar Campiani; Bujeiro, Ramiro (22 March 2011). Brazilian Expeditionary Force in World War II. Osprey Publishing. ISBN 978-1-84908-483-3.
- Oland, Dwight (1996). North Apennines 1944-1945. Washington, D.C.: U.S. Army Center of Military History. ISBN 0-16-061321-3.
- Scheina, Robert L (31 July 2003). Latin America's Wars. Potomac Books, Inc. pp. 254–. ISBN 978-1-59797-478-3.
