= Otto Fretter-Pico =

German general (1893–1966)

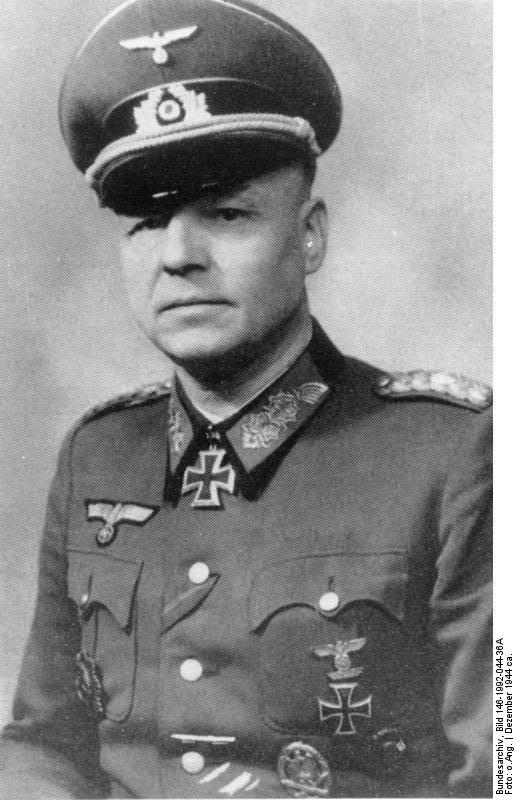
- Born: 2 February 1893; Karlsruhe, Baden, German Empire
- Died: 30 July 1966 (aged 73); Flims, Grisons, Switzerland
- Relatives: Maximilian Fretter-Pico (brother)
- Military career
- Allegiance: German Empire; Kingdom of Württemberg; Weimar Republic; Nazi Germany
- Branch: German Army
- Service years: 1914–1945
- Rank: Generalleutnant
- Commands: 57th Infantry Division; 148th Reserve Division
- Conflicts: World War I; World War II; Invasion of Poland; Battle of France; Operation Barbarossa; Battle of Stalingrad; Belgorod-Khar'kov Offensive Operation; Operation Dragoon; Italian Campaign; Battle of Garfagnana; Battle of Collecchio
- Awards: Knight's Cross of the Iron Cross

Otto Fretter-Pico (2 February 1893 – 30 July 1966) was a German general in the Wehrmacht during World War II. A veteran of WWI and the younger brother of General Maximilian Fretter-Pico, he took part in operations from Poland to France, and from the Soviet Union to Italy. Fretter-Pico commanded artillery units before commanding the 57th Infantry Division and the 148th Infantry Division. He was a recipient of the Knight's Cross of the Iron Cross of Nazi Germany.

Ahead of his 148th Infantry Division, he was blocked and surrounded by Brazilian forces in Collecchio when trying to retreat to Germany. He surrendered to the Brazilian division on 29 April 1945.

== First World War ==
Otto Fretter-Pico was born on 2 February 1893, in Karlsruhe, formerly the Grand Duchy of Baden, today Baden-Württemberg, in the German Empire, and joined the Württemberg Army on July 14, 1914, as a Fahnenjunker (officer cadet). Like his older brother, who later became General of the Artillery Maximilian Fretter-Pico, he joined the 1st Baden Field Artillery Regiment No. 14 (1. Badisches Feldartillerie-Regiment Nr. 14). They both were sent to the front, where Otto was wounded after a few days. In autumn 1914 he came back to the front. There he was promoted to Leutnant (lieutenant) on January 27, 1915. Otto would serve the whole war on the Western Front; interruptions were only made by being assigned to the staff of the 28th Division from February to May 1916 and then again briefly in October of the same year. In addition, Fretter-Pico completed a two-month course at the artillery school in late 1916. From September 1917 he took over as chief of the 6th battery of his regiment and kept this position until the end of the war. On October 18, 1918, he was promoted to Oberleutnant (first lieutenant). During World War I he was given both Iron Crosses and other awards.

== Interwar years ==
After the First World War, Fretter-Pico was accepted into the Reichsheer. He was first used in the Reichswehr 13th Artillery Regiment (Reichswehr-Artillerie-Regiment 13). With the formation of the 100,000-man army, he then joined the staff of the 2nd battalion of the 5th Artillery Regiment; where he served until 1924 as a battalion adjutant. In autumn 1924 he was transferred to the 6th battery of the 5th (Hesse-Württemberg) Artillery Regiment (5. (Hess.-Württ.) Artillerie-Regiment) in Fulda. In this unit he was promoted to Hauptmann (captain) on February 1, 1928. On October 1, 1928, he was transferred back to the staff of the 2nd battalion of the 5th Artillery Regiment. From there, Otto was then ordered to the Army Department (T 1) in the Ministry of the Reichswehr in Berlin. In the spring of 1930 he was then assigned to the regimental staff of the 5th Artillery Regiment.

On October 1, 1930, Fretter-Pico was transferred to the 7th (Bavarian) Medical Battalion (7. (Bayer.) Sanitäts-Abteilung); being appointed adjutant in said unit on May 1, 1933. On October 1, 1933, he was appointed chief of the 2nd squadron of the 7th (Bavarian) Driving Battalion (7. (Bayer.) Fahr-Abteilung). On September 13, 1934, he was recalled and briefly commanded the 3rd Battalion of the Munster Artillery Regiment until October 1, 1934, when he was transferred back to the Ministry of the Reichswehr, as inspector of the Artillery (Department In 4). On January 1, 1935, he was promoted to Major. He remained in service there when it was renamed the Reich Ministry of War (Reichskriegsministerium) in the spring of 1935.

On October 1, 1937, he was promoted to Oberstleutnant (lieutenant colonel). As such, he was appointed commander of the 7th Observation Battalion (Beobachtungs-Abteilung 7) in Ingolstadt, back in Bavaria on November 10, 1938. While there, Fretter-Pico completed a course in Jüterbog at the artillery school in January 1939.

== World War II ==
Then Lieutenant-Colonel Fretter-Pico led this battalion in the Polish campaign in September 1939, receiving the clasp for his Iron Cross 2nd class on 28 September 1939. In early February 1940 he was appointed commander of the 297th Artillery Regiment (Artillerie-Regiment 297), which he led into battle during the invasion of France. On September 1, 1940, he was promoted to Oberst (colonel).

Next he led his artillery regiment at the beginning of the invasion of the Soviet Union, in Army Group South. On December 11, 1941, Fretter-Pico was awarded the German Cross in Gold. In March 1942 he gave up command of his regiment. He was then appointed Artillery Commander 102 (Arko 102). At the end of 1942 he was then transferred to the Führerreserve. He was assigned to lead a division and was sent to Army Group B for this purpose. At the end of February 1943 he was then assigned to lead the 57th Infantry Division. On March 1, 1943, he was promoted to Generalmajor (major general). On September 1, 1943, Fretter-Pico was reassigned to the Führerreserve. On 18 September 1943 he was appointed commander of the 148th Reserve Division (148. Reserve-Division) in Toulouse. Redesignated the 148th Infantry Division (148. Infanterie-Division) in September 1944 to fight the allied invasion during Operation Dragoon, the unit was used in the counter-attacks against the Americans in the beaches at Le Muy, being slowed down by French guerrillas and British paratroopers. A retreat was ordered and the 148th crossed into Italy through the Alps.

On October 20, 1944, Fretter-Pico was promoted to Generalleutenant (lieutenant general). As such, he was awarded the Knight's Cross of the Iron Cross on December 12, 1944. The 148th would at first be used in anti-partisan warfare on the border between Tuscany and Liguria, including cooperation with other troops in some larger anti-partisan operations under the command of the 14th Army/LI. Gebirgs-Armeekorps and in cooperation with RSI units. Between the end of November and the beginning of December 1944 in the Apennines, between La Spezia and Massa-Carrara, 148th men took part in the killings of numerous Italian civilians during rastrellamento operations. During operation Catilina (27 November–2 December 1944), men of the 148th, operating together with the RSI XXXIII Brigata Nera Tullio Bertoni, operated in Fosdinovo, Sarzana and Aulla claiming 365 enemy dead and taking 20 prisoners. In operation Barbara (29 November–2 December 1944, in Carrara-Massa) men of the 148th together with other German units of the navy and special anti-partisan units claimed 110 enemy dead and took 9 prisoners. Between 20 and 25 January 1945, the 148th Infantry Division took part in operation Bergkönig, a large search and destroy operation in the areas of Varese Ligure, Monte Gottero, Zeri and Zignago, in the La Spezia region. The fighting would become known as La battaglia del Gottero.

Operation Bergkönig comprised German, Ost and RSI units:

- 148. Infanterie-Division
- 162. (Turk) Infanterie-Division
- II./Grenadier-Regiment 274 (russ.)
- Lehrstab für Bandenbekämpfung
- Lehr-Bataillon Gebirgsjäger-Schule Mittenwald
- Festungs-Brigade 135
- Divisione Monterosa
- Divisione Italia
- XXXIII Brigata Nera "Tullio Bertoni"

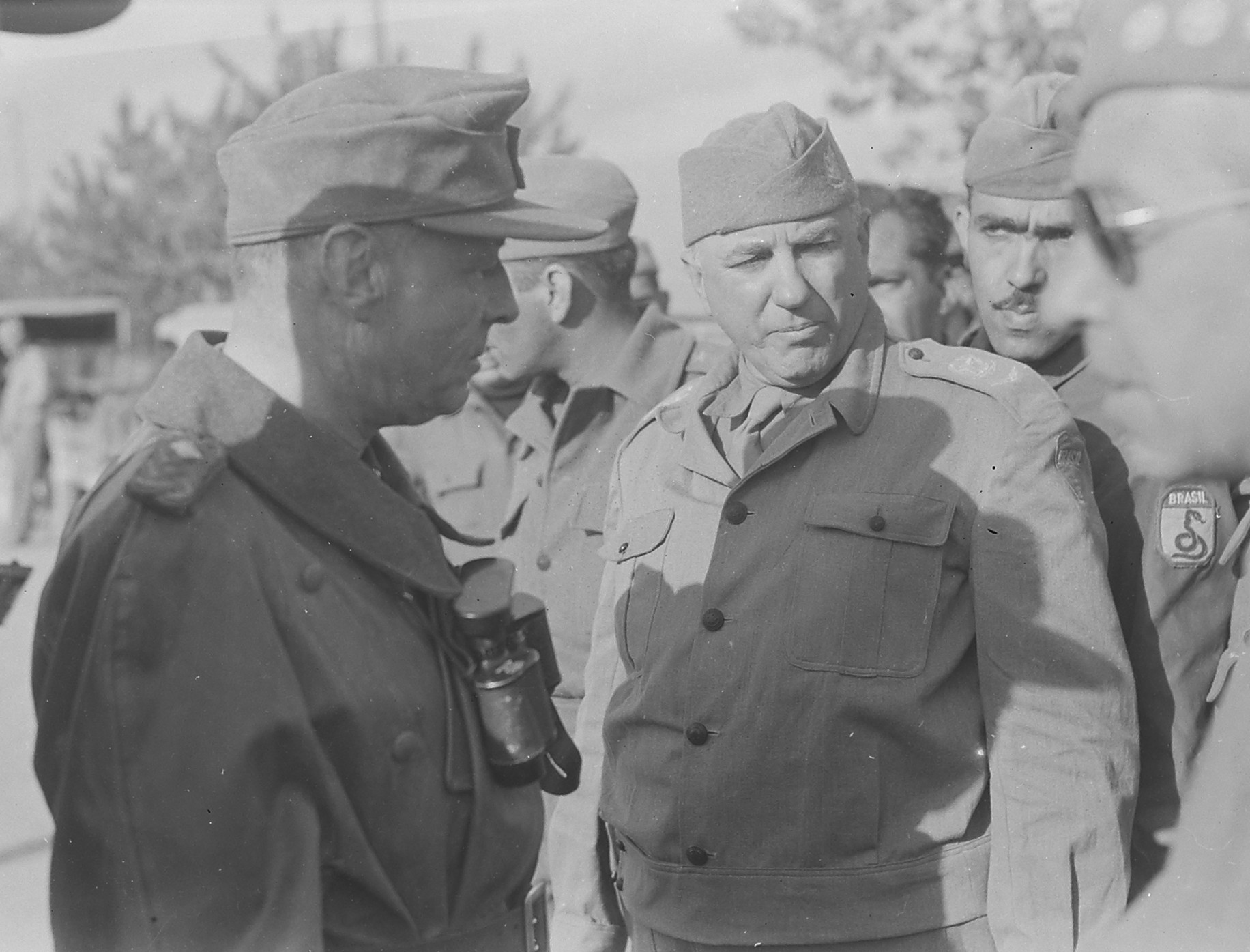
Generalleutnant Otto Fretter-Pico (left) surrendering to General Olímpio Falconière da Cunha (center) of the Brazilian 1st Infantry Division.

At the end of April 1945, during the retreat of German forces from northern Italy during the Allied Spring Offensive, Fretter-Pico's 148th Infantry Division was blocked by the Brazilian Expeditionary Force in the area of Collecchio-Fornovo di Taro while trying to gain the Po Valley. The 148th had remnants of the destroyed 90th Panzergrenadier Division and the RSI "Italia" Division tagging along but despite breakout attempts from 26 to 28 April, the Axis forces were surrounded and forced to surrender on 29 April 1945 in the Battle of Collecchio before General Heinrich von Vietinghoff's overall Axis surrender in Italy on 2 May. Generals Mario Carloni and Otto Fretter-Pico followed their 14,779 men into captivity, passing from Brazilian custody to a US POW camp some time later. He was released by US forces on July 7, 1948.

The old general then moved to Switzerland and retired there.

Fretter-Pico died at the age of 73 on July 30, 1966, in Flims, Canton of Graubünden in Switzerland.

The ceremony of Fretter-Pico's surrender to the Brazilians is still reenacted in Italy every 25 April in Fornovo and Collecchio.

== Awards and decorations ==
- Iron Cross (1914) 2nd Class (25 March 1915) & 1st Class (8 December 1917)
- Knight's Cross 2nd Class of the Order of the Zähringer Lion with Swords (13 November 1916)
- Honor Cross 3rd Class of the Royal House Order of Hohenzollern with Swords (April 1918)
- Clasp to the Iron Cross (1939) 2nd Class (28 September 1939) & 1st Class (22 June 1941)
- General Assault Badge in Silver (30 September 1941)
- German Cross in Gold as Oberst in Artillerie-Regiment 297 (11 December 1941)
- Winter Battle in the East 1941–42 Medal
- General Assault Badge
- Knight's Cross of the Iron Cross as Generalleutnant and commander of 148th Infantry Division (12 December 1944)

Military offices
Preceded by Generalleutnant Friedrich Siebert	Commander of 57th Infantry Division; 20 February 1943 – 1 September 1943	Succeeded by Generalleutnant Vincenz Müller
Preceded by Generalleutnant Friedrich-Wilhelm von Rothkirch und Panthen	Commander of 148th Reserve Division; 25 September 1943 – 20 March 1944	Succeeded by Generalleutnant Otto Schönherr
Preceded by Generalleutnant Otto Schönherr	Commander of 148th Infantry Division; 18 September 1944 – 28 April 1945	Succeeded by None
