= Army of Italy =

Army of Italy may refer to:

- Italian Army, the land forces of the military of Italy
- Royal Italian Army, (Regio Esercito) the army of the Kingdom of Italy
- National Republican Army, the army of the Italian Social Republic
- Italian Co-Belligerent Army
- Army of Italy (France), a field army of the French Revolutionary Army
