= Battle of Garfagnana =

1944 battle in Italy during World War II

- Part of the Gothic Line Offensive during the Italian campaign of World War II
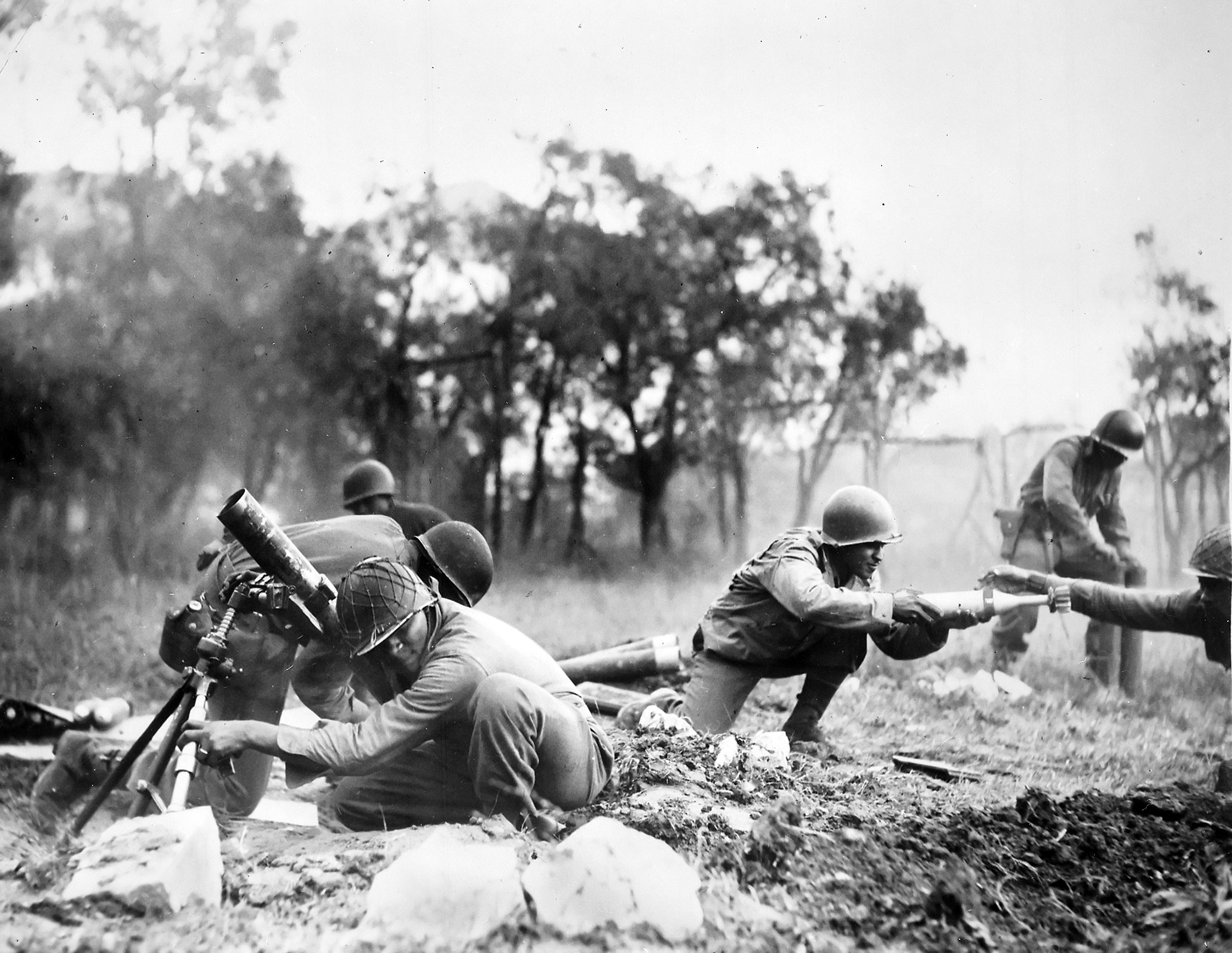
- Buffalo Soldiers of the 92nd Division provide mortar support during the fighting near Massa.
Date	26–28 December 1944
Location	North of Lucca, Italy
Result	Axis victory
Territorial changes	Territory in northern Tuscany falls back into Axis hands.

Belligerents
United States United Kingdom; India; Italian Resistance; Air support: Brazil	Italian Social Republic; Germany

Commanders and leaders
(United States) W. D. Crittenberger (United States) Edward Almond (United Kingdom) Dudley Russell	(Italian Social Republic) Rodolfo Graziani (Italian Social Republic) Mario Carloni (Nazi Germany) Otto Fretter-Pico

Strength
18,000 men 120 tanks 140 artillery pieces	9,100 men 100 artillery pieces

Casualties and losses
Nearly 1,000 killed or missing 300+ prisoners taken	c. 1,000 killed or missing

The Battle of Garfagnana (Italian: Battaglia della Garfagnana), known to the Germans as Operation Winter Storm (Unternehmen Wintergewitter) and nicknamed the "Christmas Offensive" (Italian: Offensiva di Natale), was a successful Axis offensive against American forces on the western sector of the Gothic Line during World War II. It took place in December 1944 in the north Tuscan Apennines, near Massa and Lucca.

In late December 1944 the German 14th Army under General Kurt von Tippelskirch, using a mixed Italian-German force of some eight infantry battalions, launched a limited objectives attack on the left wing of the U.S. Fifth Army in the Serchio valley in front of Lucca to pin units there which might otherwise be switched to the central front. Anticipating some operation of this sort, the Allies had ordered two brigades from Indian 8th Infantry Division to be rapidly switched across the Apennines to reinforce the US 92nd Infantry Division. By the time they arrived, the Germans and Italians had broken through to capture Barga and to rout the US Division. Reports from captured US soldiers indicated that they had intended to retreat to Lucca and beyond, but decisive action by the Indian Division's Major-General Dudley Russell stabilised the situation. With their objectives achieved, the Italian-German force broke off the attack and withdrew.

Barga was recaptured one week later in the New Year, and the front in the western Gothic Line remained nearly stable until late March 1945.

== Historical background ==
Benito Mussolini and his Defense Minister, Marshal Rodolfo Graziani, wanted to create for their Italian Social Republic (RSI) an Italian Army, independent from German control. Furthermore, they wanted some of the newly created Italian divisions to participate in a major offensive against the Allies in the Italian peninsula.

They planned an offensive in Garfagnana for two of their new divisions (the "Monte Rosa" and the "San Marco") and a German Division (and possibly another motorized), with 40,000 men and air support: their final objective would have been the reconquest, from the Allies, of Lucca, Pisa and Livorno in Tuscany. But the Italians lacked armaments, tanks and airplanes; furthermore only the Monte Rosa Division was ready in December 1944 for the offensive.

As a consequence the Germans created their own offensive, called Operation Wintergewitter under General Fretter-Pico's leadership, but with minor size and objectives: just 9,000 soldiers (mostly Italians) attacked in Garfagnana a small area of the Gothic Line, aiming to push the Allies back 25 kilometres (16 mi) and reduce their pressure in the Rimini area.

Meanwhile, units of the U.S. 92nd Infantry Division, under Major General Edward Almond, moved to the Garfagnana sector, in November, and advanced along the Serchio River Valley against light resistance. However, an attempt to capture Castelnuovo di Garfagnana did not succeed.

American patrol activity continued until after mid-December.

== The battle ==
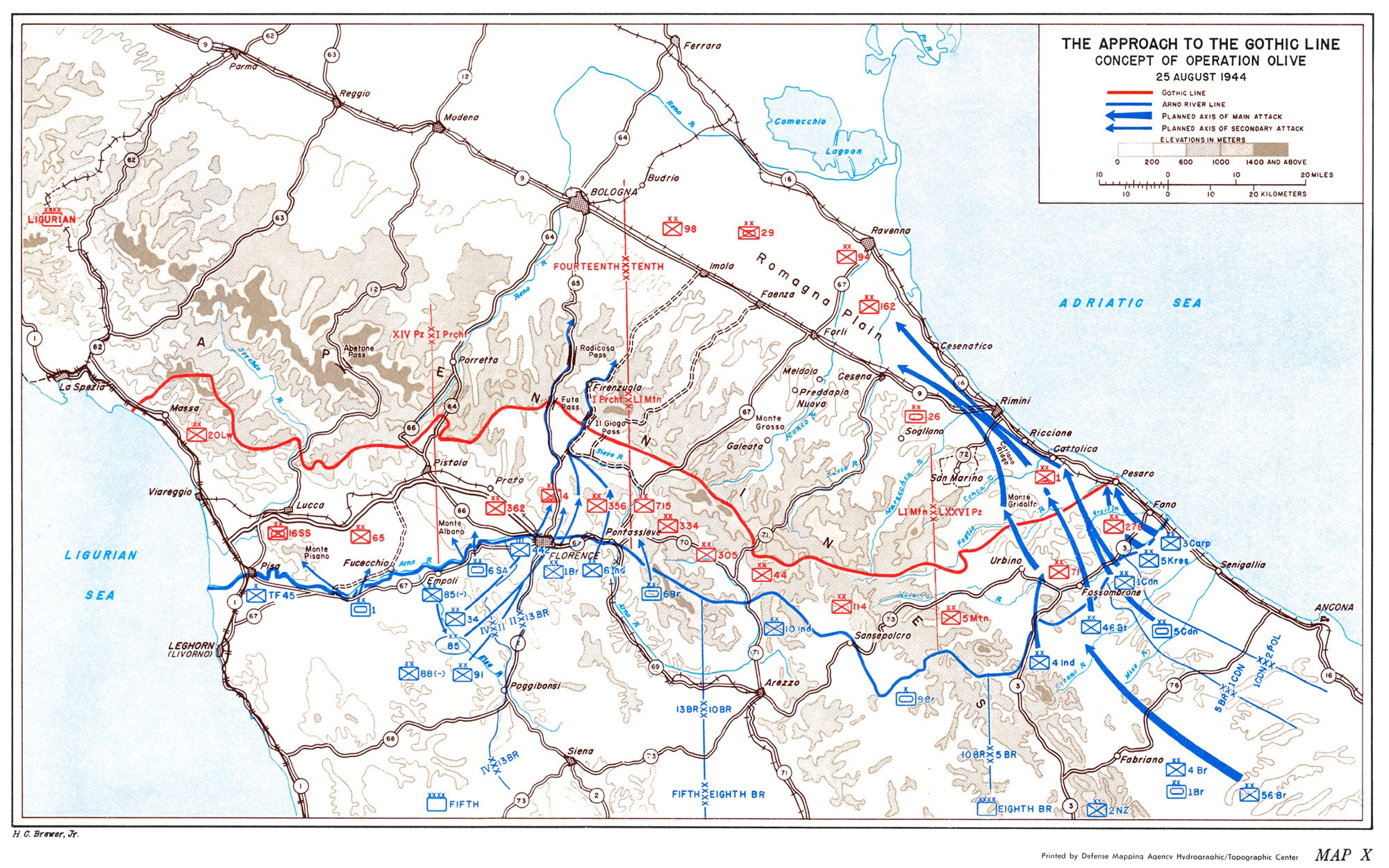
The Gothic Line, in red. Garfagnana was in the most western section, next to Lucca and Massa.

On 21 December 1944, Marshal Graziani and General Mario Carloni visited the battalions of the Monte Rosa Division in the Garfagnana, in order to prepare the offensive. Following the Ardennes Offensive on the Western Front in mid-December, Allied intelligence had considered the possibility of a similar Axis operation in Northern Italy. They had determined that the most likely objective would be the western coastal sector and as a consequence, the 19th and 21st Indian Brigades of the 8th Indian Infantry Division, under Major General Dudley Russell, were ordered from the central Apennine sector to reinforce the 92nd Infantry Division on the U.S. Fifth Army's left flank in front of Lucca. The 19th Indian Brigade arrived on 26 December and was ordered by the commander of U.S. IV Corps, Major General Willis D. Crittenberger, to take up position some 4 miles (6.4 km) behind the 92nd Division's positions. The 21st Indian Brigade arrived two days later. As further insurance, Lieutenant General Lucian Truscott, the Fifth Army commander, placed two infantry regiments from the U.S. 85th Infantry Division, under Major General John B. Coulter, under Crittenberger's command and moved additional artillery into range.

On 26 December, several RSI military units, including four battalions of the 4th Italian "Monte Rosa" Alpine Division and the 3rd Italian "San Marco" Marine Division, participated in "Operation Winter Storm" (Wintergewitter) together with three German battalions.

A total of 9,100 Axis troops (of which 66% were Italians), with 100 artillery pieces but no tanks, attacked 18,000 Allied troops which were equipped with 140 artillery batteries and 120 tanks, as well as support from 160 P-47 Thunderbolts of the Allied XXII Tactical Air Command. The surprise factor was fundamental in the attack, together with a cloudy winter front that was hoped to prevent the Allied aircraft from flying. XXII TAC P-47s were in the air throughout the day on the 26th, but continued to fly scheduled missions in Northeastern Italy until the severity of the breakthrough was known. XXII TAC retasked all missions on the 27th to support the Fifth Army front and these were key in dislodging the Axis thrust. (Note: War Diaries for December 1944 for both the 57th and 86th Fighter Groups detail the missions flown on the 26th and the responses on the 27th at http://www.57thfightergroup.org/operational_reports.html and http://www.86fighterbombergroup.com/War%20diary.htm.)

The attack against the Buffalo Soldiers (nickname of the 92nd Division) was made in three columns: two by Italians and one by Germans. While German General Fretter-Pico would be the overall commander, Italian General Carloni would lead the attack operationally. All the offensive was under leadership of Italian Marshall Rodolfo Graziani, who promoted the attack with Mussolini.

Their objective: conquest of the small towns of Barga, Sommocolonia, Vergemoli, Treppignana, Coreglia, Fornaci di Barga, Promiana, Castelvecchio and Calomini located north-west of Lucca.

The Order of Battle was:

- First column (toward Vergemoli-Calomini): Italian Alpini Intra battalion; HQ defence company of 1st Reggimento Alpini; Divisional Reconnaissance group (Monterosa Div.); Two battalion, 6th Marine Infantry Regiment (San Marco Division);
- Second column (toward Treppignana-Castelvecchio): Italian Alpini Brescia Battalion; 1st and 2nd battalions of 286th German Grenadier Regiment;
- Third column (toward Sommocolonia-Barga): German Mountain battalion Mittenwald; Groups of Kesselring battalion.

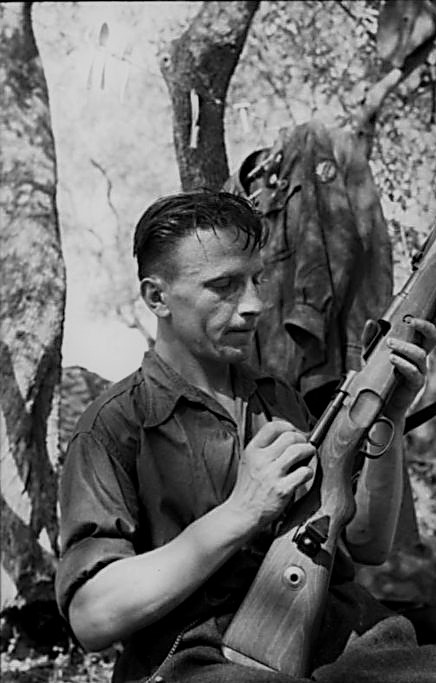
RSI Italian soldier cleaning his weapon (Mauser 98k) before the battle

Early on 26 December elements of the two German assault battalions from the third column attacked the Sommocolonia garrisoned by elements of Company F of the 2nd Battalion, 366th Regiment, supported by some partisans. Some authors state that the resistance there was tough but quickly overwhelmed. In the morning, 200 men of the Mittenwald battalion seized the American positions south of Sommocolonia at Bebbio and Scarpello held by the 92nd Recon Troop, which withdrew to Coreglia. In the meantime, Axis mortars had opened fire along the whole front and the other two columns had started moving forward: the two German grenadier battalions together with the attached company of the Italian Brescia Alpine battalion attacked successfully in the center down the Serchio valley, east of the river. West of the river, the other Brescia companies overcame a weak initial resistance, but their opponents were already falling back and the attackers advanced to Fornaci almost without opposition. Fornaci itself fell quickly, although the two German battalions were heavily criticized for their sluggishness and lack of aggressiveness. The first column, however, faced more vigorous opposition on the right of the front. The elements of the San Marco division easily seized the village of Molazzano and pushed the defenders back, but the Regimental Headquarters Company suffered losses and could not take the village of Brucciano. The Cadelo Group (of the Monte Rosa Division), supported by the Intra battalion which made small diversionary attacks, occupied Calomini, but the Vergemoli garrison (370th Infantry Regiment and some partisan groups) could not be dislodged. Under threat of encirclement and being cut off it eventually withdrew, leaving in place a partisan group as a covering party.

By 27 December the limited offensive was over. In the morning, the German assault troops entered Pian di Coreglia, their final objective and Italian patrols went forward as far as the village of Calavorno, reporting that the enemy still was in full retreat. The other columns had also reached their objective points, and an entire Allied division had been routed. Over 250 prisoners were captured with many weapons, food and equipment. Italian historian Pellegrinetti wrote that the Italian troops conquered all the villages of the valley up to the outskirts of Bagni di Lucca: on December 27 late afternoon the main offensive ended, even if the next day there were small territorial consolidations. It had been a success with a penetration of more than 25 kilometres inside the Allies lines.

As troops of the 92nd Division streamed back, they were ordered to take up positions on the left flank of the Indian positions. All Allied troops forming the defence were placed under command of Major General Russell, the 8th Indian Division commander. However, the Axis objectives were short of the Indian line and so the Axis attack was not pressed forward. By late afternoon on December 27, all objectives having been attained, the offensive ended and by the following day the Axis troops were pulling back towards their start lines with the withdrawal being completed by 30 December. The 8th Indian Divisions performed a bloodless advance simply following on the Axis retreat and no fighting took place. The Germans and Italians had withdrawn from conquered territory and on 8 January the Indian troops were withdrawn into reserve. The Alpini of the Monte Rosa Division maintained their new advanced line, 2 kilometers south of the positions they had on December 25, until March 1945.

== Consequences ==
All the objectives of the offensive were attained: the US 5th Army was tactically tripped out; Allied reserves were moved to a secondary sector; Italian Social Republican troops' morale was boosted by the success; the Axis gained a slightly better defensive situation on the Western Apennines, and indeed, the new front line stayed more or less intact until the April 1945 Axis collapse.

Marshal Rodolfo Graziani, who had promoted the attack in order to give military importance to the RSI, was extremely satisfied and wanted to continue the offensive. But the air superiority of the Allies stopped any further Axis attack to break south of the Gothic line.

Fascist propaganda of the RSI gave huge importance to the Offensive in Garfagnana, claiming it was a small Italian version of the Ardennes Offensive that happened in the same December 1944.

== See also ==
- Gothic Line
- Gothic Line order of battle
- Italian Campaign (World War II)
- Rodolfo Graziani
- Military history of Italy during World War II
- 92nd Infantry Division (United States)
- John R. Fox
- Esercito Nazionale Repubblicano
- Army Group Liguria
- Mario Carloni

== Bibliography ==
- Cornia, Carlo (1971). Monterosa (storia della Divisione Alpina Monterosa della RSI) (in Italian). Udine: Del Bianco.
- Del Giudice, Davide (2008). Linea Gotica 1944: Operazione Temporale d'Inverno (in Italian). Milano: Editoriale Ritter.
- Fiaschi, Cesare (1999). La guerra sulla linea gotica occidentale (in Italian). Bologna: Editoriale Lo Scarabeo.
- Jackson, General Sir William & Gleave, Group Captain T.P. (2004) [1st. pub. HMSO:1988]. Butler, Sir James (ed.). The Mediterranean and Middle East, Volume VI: Victory in the Mediterranean, Part 3 - November 1944 to May 1945. History of the Second World War, United Kingdom Military Series. Uckfield, UK: Naval & Military Press. ISBN 1-84574-072-6.
- Moseley, Ray (2004). Mussolini: the last 600 days of il Duce. Lanham: Taylor Trade Publications. ISBN 1-58979-095-2.
- Oland, Dwight (1996). North Apennines 1944-1945. Washington, D.C.: U.S. Army Center of Military History. ISBN 0-16-061321-3.
- Pellegrinetti, Mario (2003). Appunti per una storia della guerra civile in Garfagnana (1943-1945) (in Italian). Lucca: Editrice Fazzi. ISBN 978-88-7246-557-8.
