= Mascarenhas de Morais =

Brazilian Army officer and commander (1878–1968)

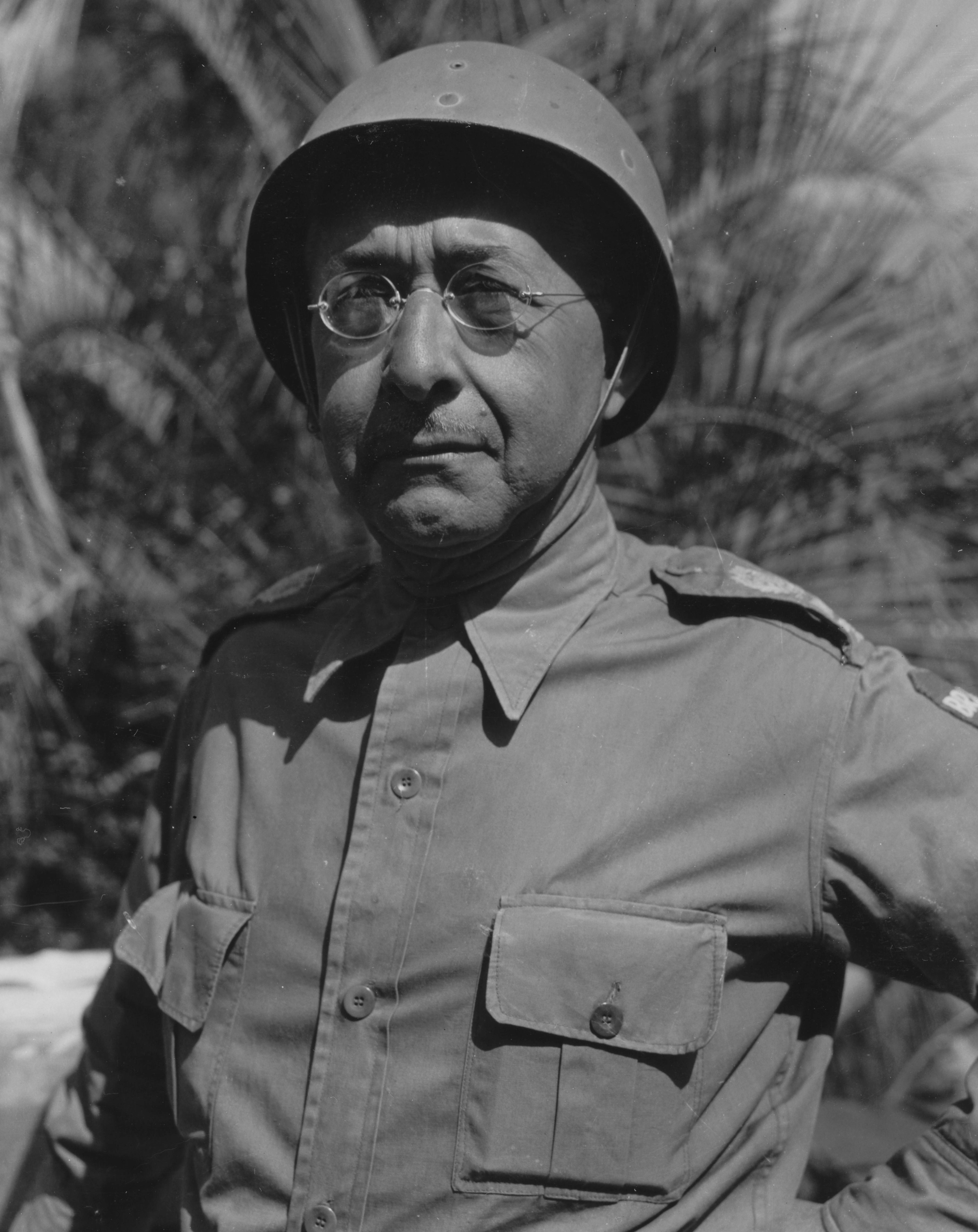
- Mascarenhas de Morais in 1944
- Born: November 13, 1878; São Gabriel, Rio Grande do Sul, Brazil
- Died: September 17, 1968 (aged 89); Rio de Janeiro, Guanabara, Brazil
- Military career
- Allegiance: Brazil
- Branch: Brazilian Army
- Service years: 1897–1946, 1951–1954
- Rank: Field marshal
- Commands: 1st Artillery Regiment; 6th Artillery Regiment; Military School of Realengo; 9th Military Region; 7th Military Region; 2nd Military Region; Brazilian Expeditionary Force; South Military Command; Staff of the Armed Forces
- Conflicts: Copacabana Fort revolt; Revolution of 1930; Constitutionalist Revolution; Communist uprising of 1935; World War II
- Awards: Combat Cross; Campaign Medal; Brazil's Blood; War Medal
- Other work: Author

João Batista Mascarenhas de Morais (November 13, 1883 – September 17, 1968) was a Brazilian army officer and commander of the Brazilian Expeditionary Force in the Second World War. He was ranked a field marshal and was the last active Brazilian marshal.

== Career ==
At age 14, living alone in Porto Alegre, working and studying, he was able to enter the Rio Pardo Preparatory and Tactical School, in Rio Grande do Sul. After leaving the course, he entered the Military School of Brazil, Known as Praia Vermelha Military School, in Rio de Janeiro.

In 1904, while still studying the third year, the Vaccine Revolt broke out in the capital. The young Mascarenhas did not participate in the movement against the compulsory vaccine law, but the Praia Vermelha School was closed and the rioters were expelled.

In 1922 there was the election of Artur Bernardes for the presidency, being in second place Nilo Peçanha the candidate supported by Rio de Janeiro. Bernardes had been facing a campaign in the newspapers about false statements made on his behalf, in which alleged letters denigrated the army and former president Hermes da Fonseca. This episode led to the discontent of some military corps, dissatisfied with the result of the election and with the previous government of Epitacio Pessoa, which eventually originated the movement known as the Revolt of the 18 of the Copacabana Fort. At that time, Mascarenhas was Captain and commanded the 1st Artillery Regiment. The revolt had taken beyond the Fort Copacabana the Military School of Realengo and some focuses in Vila Militar. Mascarenhas supported the legalistic forces, giving support to the Infantry. While not counting on his detained officers, Mascarenhas replaced them with more experienced sergeants and fulfilled his mission.

In 1930, during the Revolution of 1930 Mascarenhas remained loyal to President Washington Luiz and was arrested by the rebels headed by Getúlio Vargas, who became president himself in that same year after ousting Washington Luiz. After release, Mascarenhas continued his career in the army

In 1935, while serving as Commander of the Military School of Realengo, Mascarenhas de Morais took part in the fight against a communist uprising in Rio de Janeiro. This time, his loyalty was with the constitutional government of Getulio Vargas. In 1937 he became a General and was, in the following years, commander of the 9th and 7th and military regions in Recife and São Paulo respectively.

In 1943 he was named commander of the First Expeditionary Infantry Division of the Brazilian Expeditionary Force, the 1st DIE (in Portuguese, "Primeira Divisão de Infantaria Expedicionária"). With the cancellation of the 2nd and 3rd Divisions he thus became commander of the Brazilian Expeditionary Force, comprising only the 1st DIE. During the organization of the 1st DIE he was also head of the Brazil Military Commission with the US and visited the Mediterranean Theater of operations in 1943, before the arrival of the Brazilian Expeditionary Force.

Mascarenhas arrived in Italy with the first Brazilian troops in June 1944 and commanded the Brazilian forces until the surrender of the Axis forces in Italy, on May 2, 1945. Following the Battle of Collecchio (26–27 April 1945) and a sharp action at Fornovo di Taro, Mascarenhas de Moraes received the surrender of the German 148th Division and the Italian Monte Rosa, San Marco and Italia Divisions on 29–30 April 1945. In one week the Brazilians had taken 14,700 troops, 800 officers and two generals.

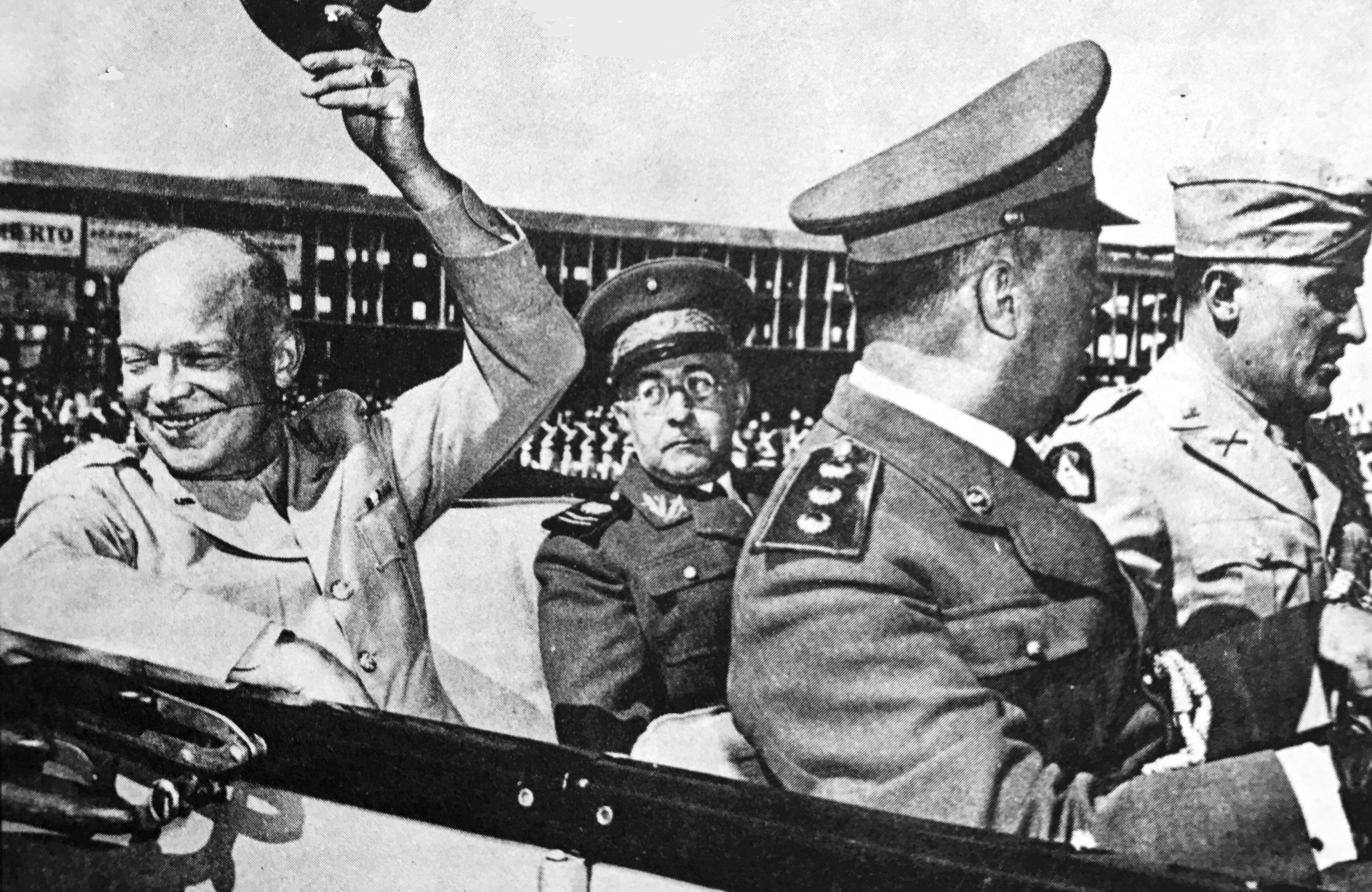
Morais (glasses) with General Dwight D. Eisenhower

After the end of the war he returned to Brazil and, in 1946, was made a marshal by the Brazilian Congress and received the command of the 1st Military Region in the then Brazilian capital, Rio de Janeiro.

After a short retirement Mascarenhas returned to active duty in 1951 as Chief of Staff of the Brazilian Armed Forces during the second Vargas government (1951–1954). After the President's suicide, in August 1954, he returned to retirement and wrote his memoirs of his time as commander of the Brazilian Expeditionary Force. A federal special law was approved by the National Congress declaring him in army's active service for life, with all responsibilities and privileges, with the rank of field marshal. He died in Rio de Janeiro in 1968.

== Personal life ==
His great-nephew is opera singer Cláudio Mascarenhas.
