= Murder of Lieutenant Alfred Lyth =

USAAF second lieutenant murdered in 1945

The murder of Second Lieutenant Alfred R. Lyth, 22, was committed in Garfagnana, Italy, by Italian "Monte Rosa" Division soldiers during World War II.

== Events ==
On February 6, 1945, Lieutenant Lyth's aircraft was hit during the bombing of a railroad tunnel, likely by German anti-aircraft fire, forcing Lyth to parachute to the ground and landing in the village of Torrite. He was later captured by "Monte Rosa" soldiers of the Italian Social Republic and conducted to their headquarters in Camporgiano, where he was interrogated. Two days later, interrogation, Lyth was being transported when he was suddenly shot.

After the war ended, the Allies investigated Lyth's death. From September 25 to October 4, 1946, an American military court tried three Italian soldiers for murder: Captain Italo Simonitti, Private Benedetto Pilon, and General Mario Carloni. Newspapers noted that in an unusual move, the prosecutor in a U.S. war crimes trials, for the first time, was an African American, Lieutenant Clarence W. Burks of Pittsburgh. Two days after Lyth's murder, Burks himself had been captured, but he and two others managed to escape with the help of Italian partisans.

The Italians initially claimed that Lyth had been trying to escape. However, witnesses said Lyth had clearly been limping. According to them, Lyth had been marched to a grave which had been dug in advance near the local cemetery. He was then shot twice by Pillon, on the orders of Simonitti. Pilon had previously said, "I shot him at a signal from Captain Simonitti because I saw what these people were doing to my country." Simonitti then shot Lyth two more times himself.

Simonitti and Pilon were found guilty, but Carloni was acquitted. Simonitti was sentenced to death, while Pilon was sentenced to life in prison with hard labor. Simonitti, 38, was executed by firing squad in Livorno on January 27, 1947. Six members of the firing squad were African-American. Before he was shot, Simonitti requested that he not have to wear the customary black hood. The request was granted. Before he was shot, Simonitti said he held no grudges against his executioners.

Although Carloni was acquitted, he was remanded to Italian custody. He held at Forte Boccea in Rome. Carloni was released without any charges on May 19, 1951, but was demoted in rank to Colonel, and stripped of all his awards given to him by the Italian Social Republic between 1943 and 1945.

Pilon and three other Italians convicted of war crimes by American military courts were later transferred to Italian custody. Under an agreement, the men were sent to an Italian prison on the Procida. However, in January 1951, to the shock and anger of local U.S. officials, Minister of Justice Attilio Piccioni declared the four men to be political prisoners and granted them amnesty.
