= Territorial Defense Militia =

The Territorial Defense Militia (Italian: Milizia di difesa territoriale; German: Landschutz-Miliz) was the equivalent of the National Republican Guard established in the Operational Zone of the Adriatic Littoral.

After the Armistice of Cassibile and the establishment of the Italian Social Republic, the northeastern provinces of Udine, Trieste, Gorizia, Pola, Fiume and Zara were placed, unlike the rest of northern Italy, under direct German military administration as Operational Zone of the Adriatic Littoral (Operationszone Adriatisches Küstenland, OZAK). Here, like in the rest of northern Italy, the Italian Social Republic established the National Republican Guard (Guardia Nazionale Repubblicana, GNR) in late 1943, by merging the former Volunteer Militia for National Security and the Carabinieri. In March 1944, however, Friedrich Rainer, Gauleiter of the OZAK, officially forbade the use of the name of the National Republican Guard within its territory, as well as the creation of the Black Brigades. The GNR in the Operational Zone of the Adriatic Littoral was thus renamed as Territorial Defense Militia.

The Territorial Defense Militia was placed under the command of General Angelo Sommavilla and was composed of five regiments, the 1st "San Giusto" (with headquarters in Trieste, where the central command of the MDT was also located), the 2nd "Istria" (with headquarters in Pola), the 3rd "Gabriele D'Annunzio" (with headquarters in Fiume), the 4th "Isonzo" (with headquarters in Gorizia), and the 5th "Friuli" (with headquarters in Udine). Each regiment consisted of 1,900 men, divided into three battalions, formed by three companies each. Additionally, a reserve battalion and a Special Services battalion were stationed in Udine, a police battalion was stationed in Gorizia, an autonomous company in Cherso, and an officers' school was created in Pola; the Civic Guards of Trieste (1,300 men) and Gorizia (250 men) were also subordinated to the M.D.T. command.

The Territorial Defense Militia was mainly employed against the Yugoslav People's Liberation Army alongside German units, fighting in Istria and the Julian March. At the end of the war, many of its members were summarily executed in the Foibe massacres or died in Yugoslav concentration camps.
