= National Republican Army =

Army of the Italian Social Republic

- Esercito Nazionale Repubblicano
- Flag of the Armed Forces of the Italian Social Republic.
- Active: 28 October 1943 – 2 May 1945
- Country: Italian Social Republic
- Allegiance: Benito Mussolini
- Type: Army
- Size: 30.000-35.000 (4 combat divisions) 140.000 of Guardia Nazionale Repubblicana (after 15 august 1944)
- Garrison/HQ: Rome (before November 1943); Brescia (after November 1943)
- Nickname: Army of the North
- Colors: Green, White and Red
- Anniversaries: 28 October
- Engagements: Italian Campaign: Battle of Anzio; Gothic Line; Battle of Garfagnana; Spring 1945 offensive in Italy; Western Front Yugoslav campaign

Commanders
- Minister of Defence: Rodolfo Graziani
- Chief of Staff: Gastone Gambara; Archimede Mischi

Insignia
- War Flag of the Italian Social Republic

The National Republican Army (Italian: Esercito Nazionale Repubblicano; abbreviated ENR), colloquially known as the Army of the North (Italian: Esercito del Nord) was the army of the Italian Social Republic (Italian: Repubblica Sociale Italiana, or RSI) from 1943 to 1945, fighting on the side of Nazi Germany during World War II. The National Republican Army was officially formed on 28 October 1943 by merging the former Royal Italian Army (Regio Esercito) units that were still loyal to fascist dictator Benito Mussolini and Italian pro-fascist units raised by the Germans after the occupation of Italy. By the end of the war, the National Republican Army collapsed due to the Allied offensive along with the general insurrection by the Italian Resistance in northern Italy. On 2 May 1945, the remaining units surrendered following the German capitulation in Italy.

== History ==
As a result of the Allied invasion of Sicily in July 1943, political forces allied to King Victor Emmanuel III seized power in Italy, imprisoned dictator Benito Mussolini and negotiated an armistice between Italian and the Allied Forces, which came into effect on 8 September 1943. On 12 September 1943, the Germans launched the Operation Oak and rescued Mussolini. The Fascist Italian Social Republic (Repubblica Sociale Italiana, or RSI) was formed as a puppet state in northern Italy with Mussolini as its leader. Marshal Rodolfo Graziani was appointed as the Minister of Defence of the RSI. On 16 October, the Rastenburg Protocol was signed with Nazi Germany. According to this protocol, the RSI was allowed to raise Division-sized military formations. This allowed Graziani to raise four RSI divisions totalling 52,000 men. In July 1944, the first of these divisions completed training and was sent to the front.

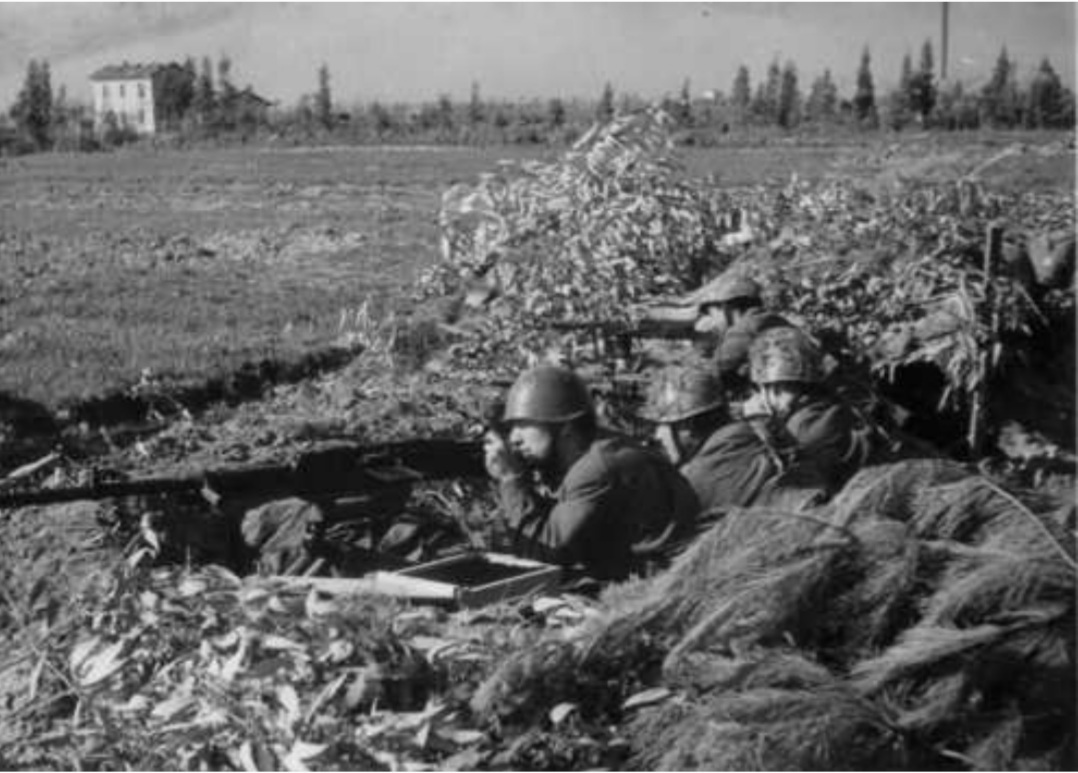
Soldiers of the National Republican Army during the Battle of Anzio near Nettuno, 1944.

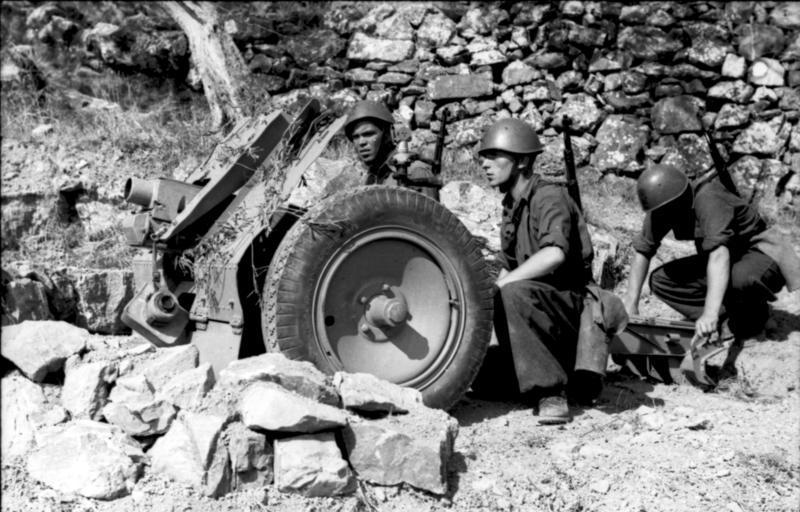
Soldiers of the National Republican Army manning a 7.5 cm leichtes Infanteriegeschütz 18.

Recruiting troops was difficult for the RSI because most of the Italian army had been interned by the Germans in 1943, many Italians had been conscripted for forced labour in Germany, and few wanted to fight on the side of Nazi Germany after 8 September 1943. The RSI became so desperate for soldiers that it granted freedom to prisoners if they would join the army, and the death penalty was imposed on anyone who resisted conscription. Autonomous military forces in the RSI also fought against the Allies, including the Decima Flottiglia MAS commanded by Prince Junio Valerio Borghese (National Republican Navy). Borghese was not loyal to Mussolini and even suggested he would take him prisoner if he could.

During the winter of 1944-1945, there were armed Italians on both sides of the Gothic Line. Four groups of Italian volunteers from the Royal Italian Army were on the Allied side. These troops (the Italian Co-Belligerent Army) were equipped and trained by the British. On the Axis side, there were four RSI divisions. Three of the RSI divisions, the 2nd Grenadier Division "Littorio", the 3rd Marine Infantry Division "San Marco", and the 4th Alpine Division "Monterosa", were assigned to Army Group Liguria under Graziani and were placed to guard the western flank of the Gothic Line facing France. The fourth RSI division, the 1st Bersaglieri Division "Italia", was attached to the German 14th Army in an area of the Apennine Mountains that was considered to be the least vulnerable to attack.

On 26 December 1944, several large RSI military units, including elements of the 4th Alpine Division "Monterosa" and the 3rd Marine Infantry Division "San Marco", took part in the Operation Winter Storm. This was a combined German and Italian offensive against the American 92nd Infantry Division. The battle was fought in the Apennines. Although limited in scale, it was a successful offensive in which RSI units played their part.

In February 1945, the 92nd Infantry Division again encountered RSI units. This time it was the 1st Bersaglieri Division "Italia". The Italians successfully stopped the advance of the US division. The Minister of Defence of the Italian Social Republic, Graziani, could even say that he commanded a whole army. This was the Italo-German Ligurian Army. However, the situation for the Axis forces on the Gothic Line subsequently deteriorated. In late April, at Collecchio, the last remaining RSI troops, along with two Wehrmacht divisions, were pinned down by the 1st Brazilian Division and forced to surrender after several days of fighting.

On 29 April, Graziani surrendered and sent a delegation to surrender at Caserta when a representative of German General Heinrich von Vietinghoff-Scheel signed the unconditional surrender of all Axis forces in Italy. However, possibly because of the Allies' low opinion and regard for the Italian Social Republic, Graziani's signature was not required at Caserta. The surrender was to take effect on 2 May. Graziani ordered the RSI forces under his command to lay down their arms on 1 May.

The Italian Social Republic suffered some 34,770 deaths during the war and, using conventional ratios of killed to wounded and killed to missing, probably more than 100,000 in total. The majority of deaths, around 21,600, were suffered by anti-partisan formations, such as National Republican Guard, Black Brigades, and Territorial Defense Militia. The remainder, approximately 13,170, were incurred by regular forces, mostly facing the Allies. The dead break down as: 13,500 members of the Guardia Nazionale Repubblicana and Milizia Difesa Territoriale, 6,200 members of the Black Brigades, 2,800 Aeronautica Nazionale Repubblicana personnel, 1,000 Marina Nazionale Repubblicana personnel, 1,900 X MAS personnel, 800 soldiers of the "Monterosa" Division, 470 soldiers of the "Italia" Division, 1,500 soldiers of the "San Marco" Division, 300 soldiers of the "Littorio" Division, 350 soldiers of the "Tagliamento" Alpini Regiment, 730 soldiers of the 3rd and 8th Bersaglieri regiments, 4,000 troops of miscellaneous units of the Esercito Nazionale Repubblicano (excluding the above-mentioned Divisions and Alpini and Bersaglieri Regiments), 300 members of the Legione Autonoma Mobile "Ettore Muti", 200 members of the Raggruppamento Anti Partigiani, 550 members of the Italian SS, and 170 members of the Cacciatori degli Appennini Regiment.

== Organization ==
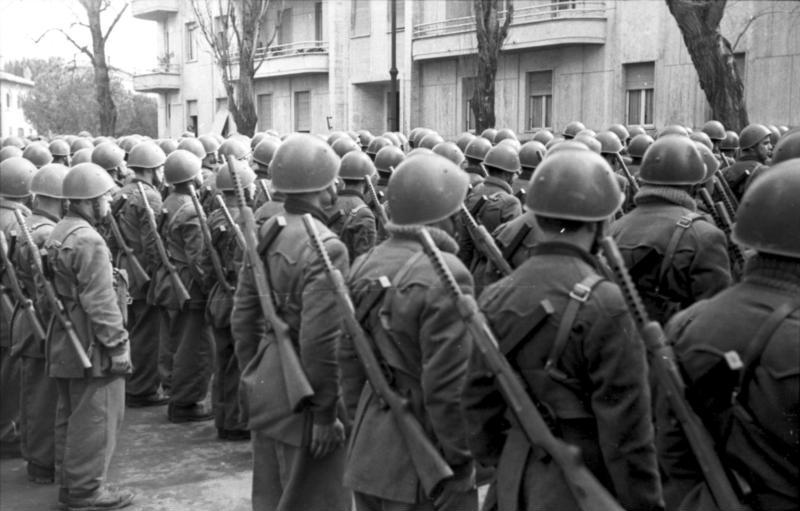
Soldiers of the 3rd Marine Infantry Division "San Marco" of the Italian Social Republic, inspected by the German General Kurt Mälzer in Rome in March 1944.

Following Italy's withdrawal from the Axis alliance on 8 September 1943, the Wehrmacht disarmed and captured Italian soldiers as part of Operation Achse, deporting some 650,000 to the German Reich and occupied territories. As the Italian Social Republic remained a German puppet state, these prisoners were reclassified as 'military internees' rather than prisoners of war and put to work.

A small percentage of these internees, along with volunteers and conscripts from Italy, were sent to southern Germany, mainly to military camps in Heuberg, Münsingen, Grafenwöhr and Sennelager, where they were raised, trained and equipped to form the National Republican Army. The RSI raised four divisions, each structured similarly to the German Jäger divisions. These divisions typically consisted of two infantry regiments, each with three battalions, an artillery regiment and additional support units. The National Republican Army comprised the following four divisions:

- 1st Bersaglieri Division "Italia"
- 2nd Grenadier Division "Littorio"
- 3rd Marine Infantry Division "San Marco"
- 4th Alpine Division "Monterosa"

There were also a large number of smaller autonomous units.

== See also ==
- Battle of Garfagnana
- Italian Campaign (World War II)
- Italian Co-belligerent Army
- Mediterranean and Middle East theatre of World War II
- Military history of Italy during World War II
- Royal Italian Army

== Sources ==
- Mitcham, S.W. (2007). German Order of Battle: 291st-999th Infantry divisions, named infantry divisions, and special divisions in World War II. Stackpole Books. ISBN 978-0-8117-3437-0.
- Blaxland, Gregory (1979). Alexander's generals: The Italian campaign 1944-45. W. Kimber. ISBN 0-7183-0386-5.
- Dollinger, Hans (1968) [1965]. The decline and fall of Nazi Germany and Imperial Japan: a pictorial history of the final days of World War II. Translated by Pomerans, Arnold. New York: Crown Publishers. LCCN 67-27047.
- Giannasi, Andrea (2004). Il Brasile in guerra: la partecipazione della Força Expedicionaria Brasileira alla campagna d'Italia (1944-1945) [Brazil at War: the Brazilian Expeditionary Force's participation in the Italian campaign (1944-1945)] (in Italian). Prospettiva Editrice. ISBN 8874182848.
- Jowett, Philip S. (2001). The Italian Army, 1940-1945 (3): Italy, 1943-45. Osprey Publishing. ISBN 1855328666.
- Mack Smith, Denis (1983). Mussolini: A Biography. New York: Vintage Books. ISBN 978-0394716589.
- Popa, Thomas A. (1996). Po Valley. United States Army Center of Military History. ISBN 0-16-048134-1. Archived from the original on September 26, 2012.
- NS-Zwangsarbeit, Dokumentationszentrum (1943-09-08). "Germany and Italy as allies 1936-1943". NS-Zwangsarbeit (in German).
- Crippa, P.; Cucut, C. (2020). The divisions of the army of the R.S.I. 1934-1945. Witness to war. Soldiershop Publishing. ISBN 978-88-9327-615-3.
