= Mario Carloni =

Italian soldier (1894–1962)

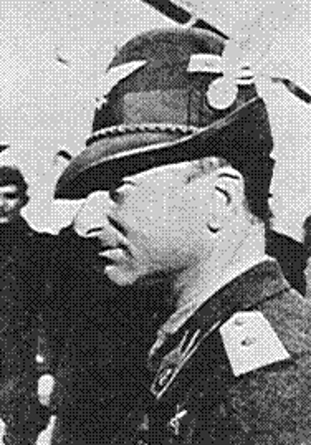
- General Mario Carloni wearing an alpini hat while in command of the RSI Monterosa Division prior to the battle of Garfagnana, December 1944.
- Born: 27 December 1894; Naples, Italy
- Died: 30 January 1962 (aged 67); Rome, Italy
- Allegiance: Kingdom of Italy; Italian Social Republic
- Branch: Royal Italian Army; National Republican Army
- Commands: 31st Infantry Regiment "Siena"; 6th Bersaglieri Regiment; 1st Bersaglieri Division "Italia"; 4th Alpine Division "Monterosa"
- Battles / wars: World War I; World War II; Greco-Italian War; Eastern Front; Italian campaign; Battle of Garfagnana; Battle of Collecchio
- Awards: Military Order of Savoy; Medal of Military Valor; War Merit Cross; Order of the Crown of Italy; Iron Cross; German Cross

General Mario Carloni (27 December 1894 – 30 January 1962) was an Italian soldier who fought in World War I and World War II. He started his career in 1912 joining as a volunteer in the 5th Reg. of Bersaglieri in Senigallia. In 1940 he reached the rank of colonel.

During the Second World War he fought in Greece, Russia and in the Italian Campaign. His son Bruno died on the Russian Front in 1942. Following the Italian Armistice in 1943, after a brief time imprisoned by the Germans, he joined Mussolini's Italian Social Republic and was appointed as commander of the 4th "Monte Rosa" Alpine Division.

In December 1944 he led the German and Italian RSI troops in the battle of Garfagnana defeating the 92nd US "Buffalo" Division. On 1 March 1945 he was promoted to the rank of general of division and assigned to the 1st Division "Italia". On 29 April he surrendered to the Brazilian Expeditionary Force after the battle of Collecchio.

In 1946, Carloni was prosecuted by the U.S. Army for the murder of Lieutenant Alfred Lyth, an American pilot killed by Monte Rosa soldiers, after his capture. He was acquitted, but was held in Italian custody at Forte Boccea in Rome. Carloni was released without any charges on 19 May 1951, but was demoted in rank to Colonel, and stripped of all his awards given to him by the Italian Social Republic between 1943 and 1945.

== Works ==
- La campagna di Russia. Milan: Longanesi. 1956.

== Bibliography ==
- Bertolotti, Claudio (2007). Storia del battaglione Bassano, Divisione Monterosa RSI 1943-1945. Milano: Lo Scarabeo Editore. ISBN 88-8478-110-8.
- Papuli, Gino (1991). Il labirinto di ghiaccio. Terni: Edizioni Thyrus Arrone.
- Pisanò, Giorgio; Baldrati, Pieramedeo (1994). Gli ultimi in grigioverde. Vol. 1. Milano: CDL Edizioni.
