= 1st Bersaglieri Division "Italia" =

- 1ª Divisione bersaglieri "Italia"
- Active: 25 November 1943 – 29 April 1945
- Country: Italian Social Republic
- Branch: National Republican Army
- Engagements: World War II: Italian campaign; Gothic Line; Spring 1945 offensive in Italy; Battle of Collecchio

Commanders
- Notable commanders: Mario Carloni

The 1st Bersaglieri Division "Italia" (Italian: 1ª Divisione bersaglieri "Italia") was one of four divisions raised by Mussolini's Italian Social Republic. It existed from 25 November 1943 until 29 April 1945.

== History ==
The Division was formed from Italian POWs in Germany and new conscripts from Northern Italy. The Division was trained in Heuberg on the Swabian Jura, modern-day Baden-Württemberg, and was only ready for combat in December 1944. The 1st Bersaglieri Division received the same equipment as the other ENR divisions, but they were forced, more than once, to give armaments and materials up to German units sent to fight on the Western Front.

The 14,000 men strong Division was then to join the Monterosa Division at the Gothic Line. It was attached to the German 14th Army. Many soldiers were from the south of Italy and crossed the frontline to be able to return home. Other units fought well and resisted several allied attacks on their positions. In February 1945, the 92nd Infantry Division came up against the Bersaglieri of the 1st Italian "Italia" Infantry Division. The Italians successfully halted the US division's advance. However, the situation subsequently deteriorated for the Axis forces on the Gothic Line.

In April 1945 the Gothic Line collapsed under the Spring 1945 offensive in Italy. The 1st Italia Division was defeated by the Brazilian Expeditionary Force in the Battle of Collecchio and surrendered.

== Commanders ==
- General Mario Carloni : November 1943 – July 1944,
- General Guido Manardi : July 1944 – February 1945,
- General Mario Carloni : February 1945 – April 1945.

== See also ==
- Benito Mussolini
- Repubblica Sociale Italiana (Italian Social Republic) [1943–1945]
- Esercito Nazionale Repubblicano (Republican National Army)

== Sources ==
- ITALIA, ITALIA, ITALIA! Flames of War
- Axis history
