= 4th Alpine Division "Monterosa" =

- 4ª Divisione alpina "Monterosa"
- Active: 1 January 1944 - 28 April 1945
- Country: Italian Social Republic
- Branch: National Republican Army
- Type: Alpini
- Role: Mountain warfare
- Size: Division
- Patron: Monte Rosa
- Engagements: World War II: Italian campaign; Gothic Line; Battle of Garfagnana; Second Battle of the Alps; Spring 1945 offensive in Italy

Commanders
- Notable commanders: Mario Carloni

The 4th Alpine Division "Monterosa" (Italian: 4ª Divisione alpina "Monterosa") was one of four divisions raised by Mussolini's Italian Social Republic. It existed from 1 January 1944 until 28 April 1945.

== Name ==
Monterosa is Italian taken from the name of the Monte Rosa, a mountain massif in the eastern part of the Pennine Alps, between Italy's and Switzerland's. Monte Rosa is the second highest mountain in the Alps and western Europe, after Mont Blanc.

The division was manned by Alpini troops, which were the mountain troops of the Kingdom of Italy, and later the Italian Republic.

== History ==
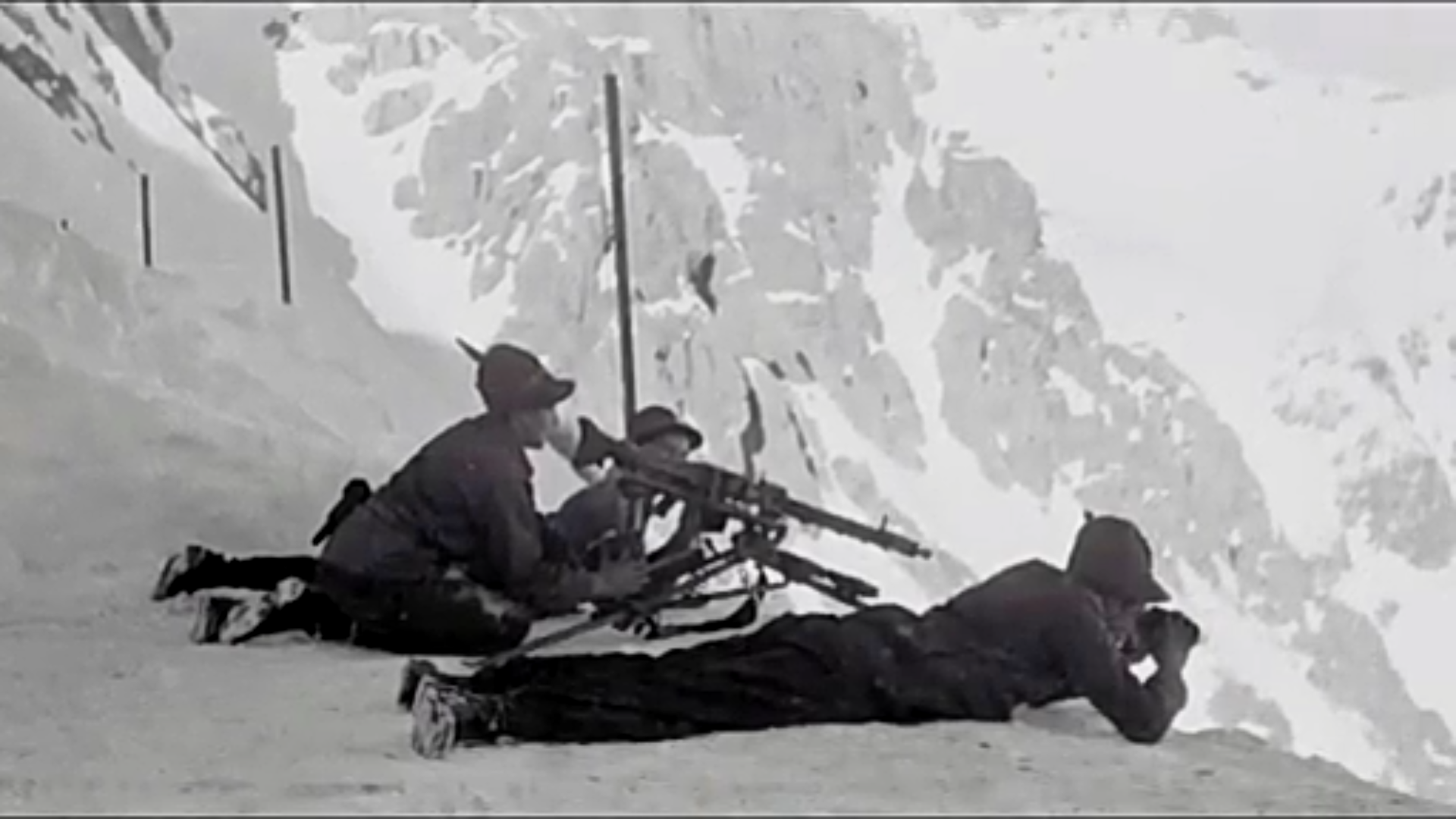
Italian Alpini in Aosta Valley 1945

The Division was formed from Italian POW's in Germany (16%) and new conscripts from Northern Italy (84%). It was trained in Germany and was ready for combat in July 1944.

The 20,000 men strong Division was then sent to Liguria and was from July to October 1944, part of the Army Group Liguria under Marshal Graziani. It made defensive preparations against a possible Allied landing and was also engaged in anti-partisan operations. In this period, many soldiers of the Monterosa deserted.

In October 1944, the Division was sent to protect the Gothic Line, arriving at the 29th and being attacked by the Brazilian Expeditionary Force in the Serchio area. The Monterosa Division also participated in the successful Italo-German Operation Winter Storm, the Battle of Garfagnana.

In February 1945 the larger part of the Monterosa Division was transferred to the Piedmont Alps, where it fought against French regular and partisan forces in the Second Battle of the Alps until the end of the war.

== War Crimes ==
Four Italian officers of the Monterosa division were found guilty for the death of 33 forced labourers at Col du Mont Fornet in the Valle d'Aosta on 26 January 1945, who perished in an avalanche while forced to carry military supplies to a mountain outpost despite severe weather conditions. Two of the four officers were sentenced to a ten-year jail term but pardoned in a 1947 general amnesty.

In September 1946, three soldiers of the Monterosa Division were tried by an American military court for the murder of Lieutenant Alfred Lyth, an airman of the United States Army Air Forces. The defendants were Captain Italo Simonitti, Private Benedetto Pilon, and General Mario Carloni. In October 1946, Carloni was acquitted, but Simonitti and Pilon were both found guilty. Simonitto was sentenced to death, whereas Pilon was sentenced to life in prison with hard labor.

Simonitti, 38, was executed by firing squad in Livorno on January 27, 1947. Pilon and three other Italians convicted of war crimes by American military courts were later transferred to Italian custody. Under an agreement, the men were sent to an Italian prison on the Procida. However, in January 1951, to the shock and anger of local U.S. officials, Minister of Justice Attilio Piccioni declared the four men to be political prisoners and granted them amnesty.

== Commanders ==
- Colonel Umberto Manfredini, 1 January 1944 - 23 March 1944
- General Goffredo Ricci, 23 March 1944 - 15 July 1944
- General Mario Carloni, 15 July 1944 - 20 February 1945
- Colonel Giorgio Milazzo 20 February 1945 - 28 April 1945

== Memory ==
Artillery Lieutenant Cesare Fiaschi wrote two books about his time in the Monterosa Division:

- La guerra sulla linea gotica occidentale: Divisione Monterosa 1944-45 [War on the Western Gothic Line: Monterosa Division 1944–45]. Bologna: Lo Scarabeo. 1999.
- Un alpino dal regio esercito alla R.S.I.: 1942-1945 dai Balcani alla Linea Gotica [An Alpino from the Royal Army to the R.S.I.: 1942-1945 from the Balkans to the Gothic Line]. Bologna: Lo Scarabeo. 1999. ISBN 978-8884780836.

== See also ==
- Benito Mussolini
- Repubblica Sociale Italiana (Italian Social Republic) [1943-1945]
- Esercito Nazionale Repubblicano (Republican National Army)

== Sources ==
- Monterosa Alpini Division Flames of War
- Axis history
