= 232nd Division =

232nd Division may refer to:

- 232nd Infantry Division (Wehrmacht), Germany
- 232nd Rifle Division, Soviet Union

== See also ==
- List of military divisions by number
- 232nd Regiment (disambiguation)
