= 85th Infantry Regiment (United States) =

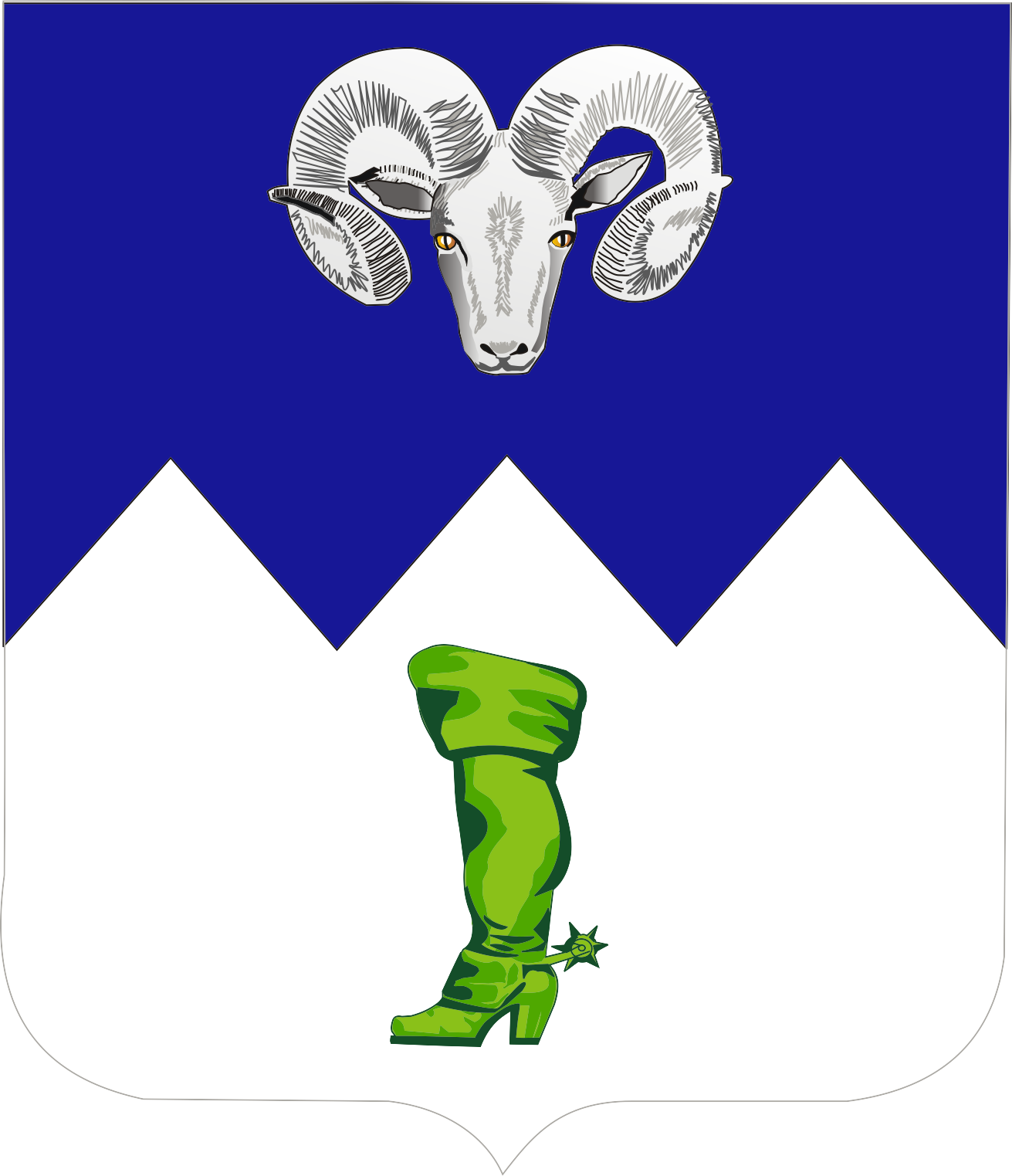
- Coat of arms
- Active: 1918
- Country: United States
- Branch: Army
- Type: Infantry
- Role: Light Infantry
- Size: Regiment
- Part of: 10th Mountain Division
- Motto: "Fix Bayonets"
- Colors: Blue

Insignia
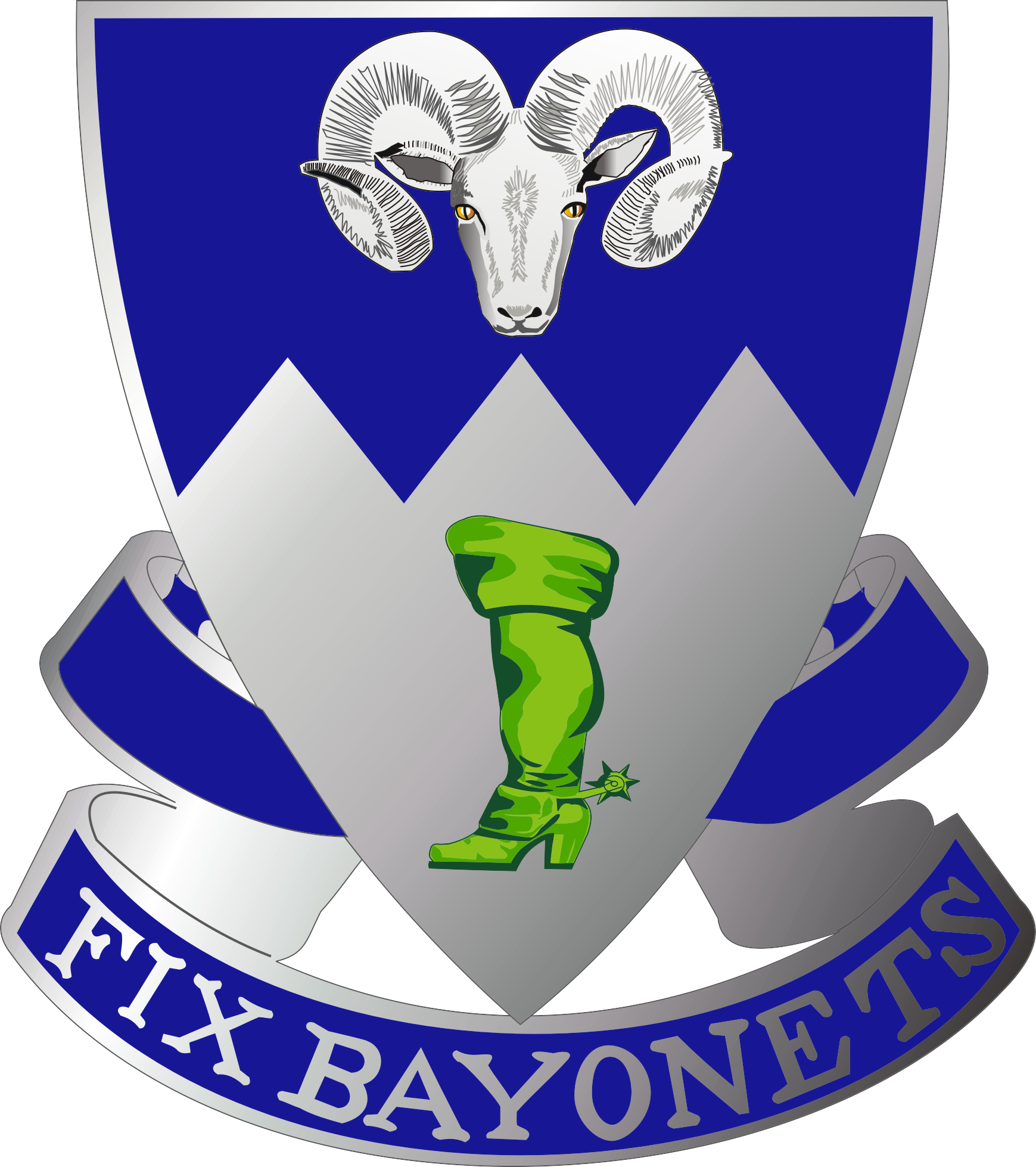
- Distinctive unit insignia

The 85th Infantry Regiment is an infantry regiment in the United States Army.

== History and lineage ==
The 85th Infantry was briefly activated during World War I, but never sent overseas, then reactivated during World War II at Camp Hale in 1942, with three battalions, and attached to the 10th Mountain Division.

Constituted 31 July 1918 in the Regular Army as the 85th Infantry and assigned to the 18th Division. Organized September 1918 at Camp Travis, Texas, from personnel of the 35th Infantry Regiment. Relieved from the 18th Division and demobilized 13 February 1919 at Camp Travis.

The regiment was activated 15 July 1943 at Camp Hale, Colorado and assigned to the 10th Mountain Division the same day. Redesignated 85th Mountain Infantry 6 November 1944. Along with the rest of the 10th Mountain, the 85th Infantry was assigned to the Italian front, departing Hampton Roads, Virginia on 4 January 1945 aboard the SS West Point and arriving at Naples on 13 January 1945. From Naples the regiment proceeded to the front line between the Serchio Valley and Mount Belvedere, arriving by 20 January. There it took part in Operation Encore, a series of attacks in conjunction with troops of the 1st Brazilian Infantry Division, to dislodge the Germans from their artillery positions in the Northern Apennines on the border between Tuscany and Emilia-Romagna regions, enabling the Allied advance over the Po Valley. As part of Operation Craftsman, the regiment contributed to the division's breakout of the Northern Apennines. As part of this operation, two of its best-known members became casualties: Second Lieutenant Bob Dole and future US senator was seriously wounded; Pfc. John Magrath, the only member of the 10th Mountain Division to receive the Medal of Honor, after single-handedly clearing four enemy machine-gun nests, was killed by a mortar round. On 20 April the regiment poured out of the Apennines, and crossed the Po river 23 April. Once across the Po, the regiment proceeded north to Lake Garda, reaching that alpine lake by 28 April. Four days later the German army in Italy surrendered.

In July, the Department of War assigned the 10th Mountain to the Pacific theater; after a month's furlough the men would assemble at Camp Carson, where they would train for Operation Downfall, the invasion of mainland Japan. The regiment proceeded to Naples, where they boarded the Marine Fox on 30 July; while the regiment sailed to the United States, on 6 August Hiroshima was leveled by an atom bomb. Three days after the 85th Mountain Infantry landed stateside on 11 August, Japan officially surrendered. The regiment was demobilized and inactivated on 26 November 1945 at Camp Carson, Colorado.

The regiment was redesignated 85th Infantry and assigned to 10th Infantry Division 18 June 1948, then activated 1 July 1948 at Fort Riley, Kansas. Inactivated 1 July 1957 in Germany.

The 3rd Battalion, 85th Infantry Regiment was reactivated at Fort Drum, NY on 22 August 2007 as the warrior transition unit for Fort Drum NY and the Northeastern United States.

== Campaign streamers ==
World War II

- North Apennines
- Po Valley

== Medal of Honor ==
- John D. Magrath

== Distinctive unit insignia ==
- Description

A Silver color metal and enamel device 1 3/16 inches (3.02 cm) in height overall consisting of a shield blazoned: Per fess dancetté Azure and Argent, in chief a ram's head affronté of the second and in base a jack boot Vert. Attached below and to the sides of the shield a Blue scroll turned Silver inscribed "FIX BAYONETS" in Silver letters.

- Symbolism

The blue is for Infantry and the ram's head symbolizes a unit skilled in mountain activity. The white (silver) base with the dancetté partition line represents snow-capped mountains and the green boot is an allusion to service in Italy.

- Background

The distinctive unit insignia was approved on 18 May 1951.

== Coat of arms ==
Blazon

- Shield- Per fess dancetté Azure and Argent, in chief a ram's head affronté of the second and in base a jack boot Vert.
- Crest- None.
- Motto- FIX BAYONETS.

Symbolism

- Shield- The blue is for Infantry and the ram's head symbolizes a unit skilled in mountain activity. The white base with the dancetté partition line represents snow-capped mountains and the green boot is an allusion to service in Italy.
- Crest: None.

Background- The coat of arms was approved on 18 May 1951.
