= Operation Encore =

1945 Allied offensive in World War II

- Part of World War II
Date	18 February – 5 March 1945 (15 days)
Location	Northern Italy 44°13′N 10°55′E
Result	Allied victory

Belligerents
United States; Brazil	Germany

Commanders and leaders
Major General George Price Hays; General Mascarenhas de Morais; General Charlie Blessis	General Eccard Freiherr von Gablenz

Units involved
10th Mountain Division; Brazilian Expeditionary Force	232nd Infantry Division; 114th Jäger Division; 29th Infantry Division

Casualties and losses
US: 1,580 casualties, 338 killed Brazilian: 25 killed, 169 wounded	Over 200 killed, 1,000+ taken prisoner
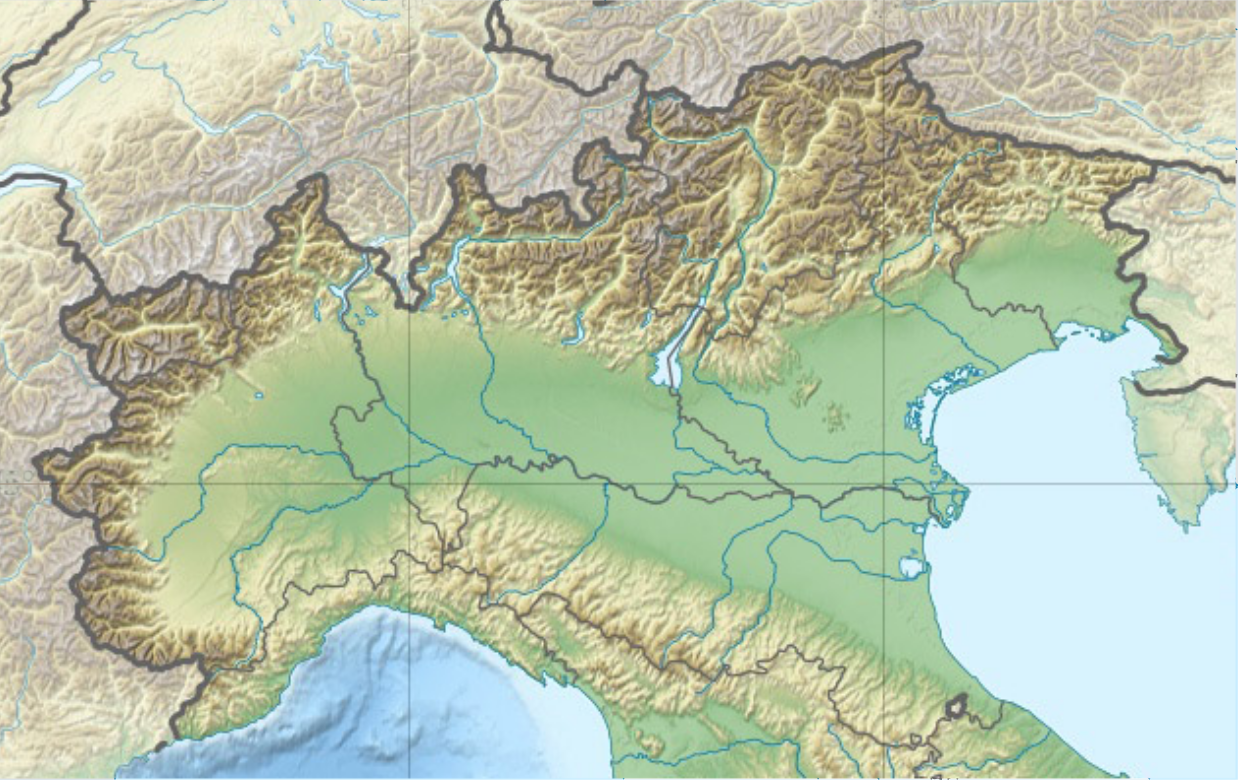
- Location of Operation Encore within Northern Italy

Operation Encore was the Allied offensive timed for February—March 1945, to break through the Gothic Line. This was initiated at the army instead of corps level. This comprised an assault by the 10th Mountain Division and the Brazilian Expeditionary Force to secure the high ground dominating Strada statale 64 Porrettana where it crossed the Apennine Mountains (18 February—25 February 1945), followed by a limited offensive that ended with the capture of the crossroads at Castel d'Aiano (3 March—5 March 1945) Once these objectives were achieved, the Fifth Army could successfully penetrate the northern Apennines to reach the Po Valley as part of the Spring 1945 offensive in Italy.

== Background ==
Following the capture of Rome 4 June 1944, the Allied forces proceeded north in two groups: the British Eighth Army (Lieutenant-General Oliver Leese) advancing along the coastal plain of the Adriatic, and the U.S. Fifth Army (Lieutenant General Mark Clark) to the west through the central Apennine Mountains. Before them stood the carefully prepared German defenses of the Gothic Line. General Clark's plan had initially been to drive through the Apennines at two points: the main body of II Corps would advance north along the Strada statale 65 della Futa, the highway that connects Florence to Bologna by way of the Futa Pass. When these troops encountered the expected enemy resistance, the 34th Division would launch a strong diversionary attack west of the Futa Pass, while the rest of II Corps would bypass Futa Pass to the east and attack the lightly defended Il Giogo Pass near the boundary of the German Fourteenth and Tenth Armies. This attack began 10 September 1944.

However, the Apennines were a formidable terrain and despite reduced numbers and limited supplies the Germans proved to be stubborn foes in their well-prepared defensive positions. While the American divisions managed to advance past both the Futa and Il Giogo passes, it was at a high cost. Between 10 September and 26 October, II Corps' four divisions had suffered over 15,000 casualties. On 27 October General Sir Henry Maitland Wilson, the Supreme Allied Commander in the Mediterranean, ordered a halt to these offensives.

The Allies made one last attempt to break through the Apennines, using units of the recently arrived Brazilian Expeditionary Force (BEF) and the 92nd Infantry Division. To the west of Futa Pass, the Strada statale 64 passed Mount Belvedere on its route to Bologna; control of Mount Belvedere would give the Allies control of the highway, allowing a breakthrough into the Po Valley. From 24 November through 12 December three unsuccessful assaults were made to capture the mountain, but despite Allied efforts each time they secured the peak of the mountain, German artillery drove them off the heights.

A few weeks later the US 10th Mountain Division, the only American mountain infantry unit, and which had been stateside impatiently waiting to participate in the fighting, arrived in Italy. The 10th arrived at Naples piecemeal starting 22 December 1944, with the last units landing on 13 January 1945. From Naples they made their way by ship or by rail in forty-and-eights to Livorno, then by trucks to Pisa. From Pisa the men proceeded to Vidiciantico which became divisional headquarters, and proceeded to prepare for battle.

== Battle of Mount Belvedere ==
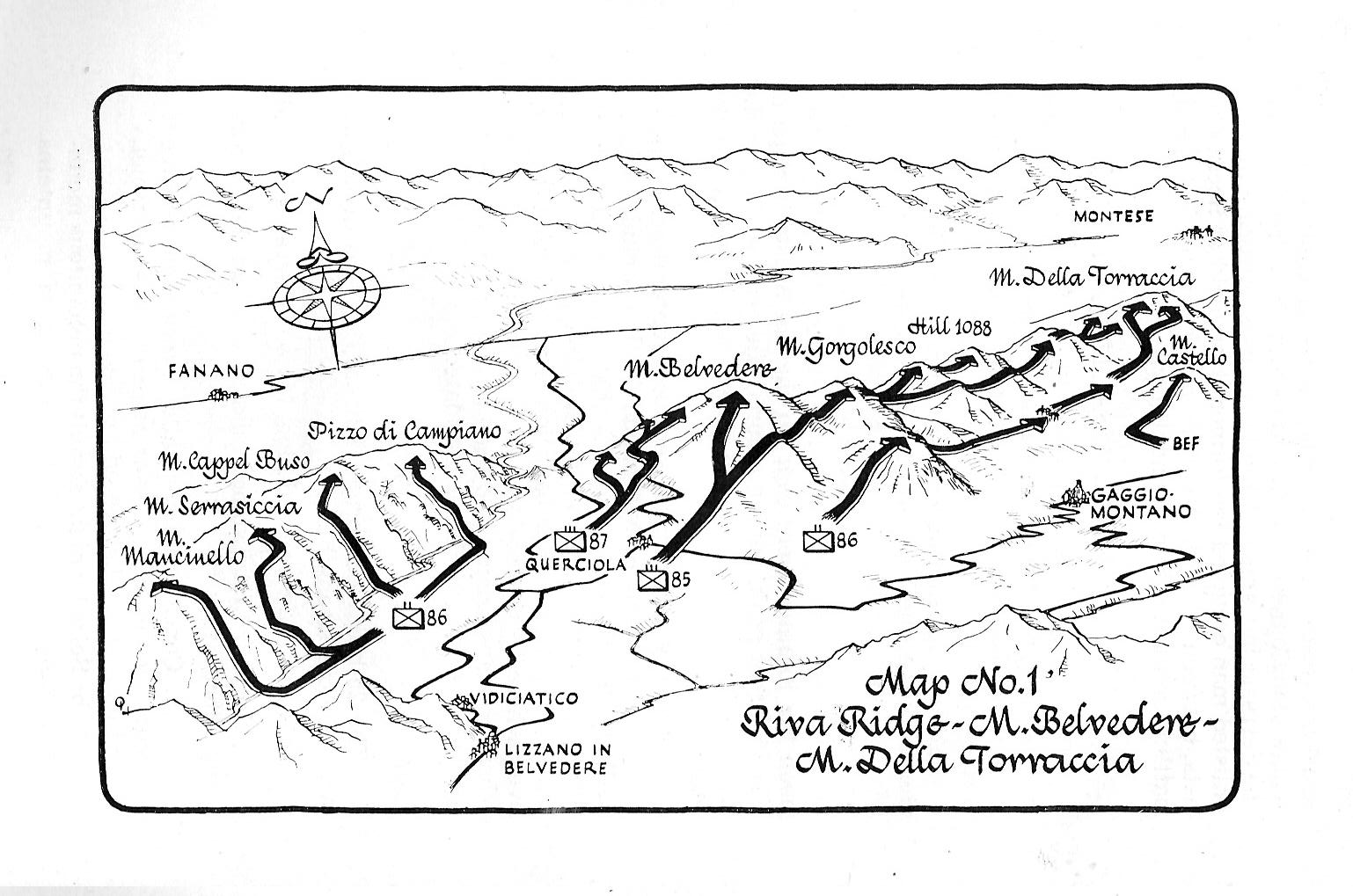
Map of the Battle of Mountain Belvedere

Previous attempts in November 1944 to secure Mount Belvedere had ended in failure. The specialist 10th Mountain Division, under General Charlie Blessis, was assigned to secure it and nearby mountains. They were supported on their right by the BEF. Because the 10th Mountain was light on organic artillery, Major General Willis Crittenberger, commander of the IV Corps, lent them two field artillery battalions, a Chemical Mortar battalion, two tank destroyer battalions, and one tank battalion.

Facing the Allied troops was the German 232nd Infantry Division, which had been intended to be a second-line unit, but had been fighting in the line since its arrival in Italy in August 1944. The units of this division most involved in this battle were the 1044th Grenadiers regiment, the 232nd Rifle and the 232nd Fusiliers battalions; the 1044th Grenadiers were assigned the sector from Cima Tauffi in the west to Mount Belvedere, and the two battalions served as reinforcements. The 4th Hochgebirgsjäger battalion also served as reinforcements. At the time the attack began, German General Eccard Freiherr von Gablenz had convened a meeting at Castel d'Aiano to discuss replacing the 1044th Grenadiers in the line with a regiment of the 114th Jäger Division; the adjutant and the intelligence officer of the 1044th Grenadiers were away at the meeting the morning of 19 February.

The first move was to capture the Pizzo di Campiano–Monte Mancinello range of mountains, known to the Americans as Riva Ridge, rising southwest of Mt. Belvedere. General Hays had noticed that observation posts on this range provided excellent views of the south slope of Mt. Belvedere, and correctly deduced German possession of this ridge had contributed to the previous unsuccessful attempts to capture Mt. Belvedere. As Peter Shelton writes, "They not only had a perfect stadium-like view of Allied comings and goings, they could direct devastating fire in behind any approach to Belvedere's south slope." German observation posts on this ridge had to be neutralized first, so on the night of 18/19 February 1945 the first battalion of the 86th Mountain Infantry Regiment, augmented by company F from the second battalion, scaled the 500-meter-tall (1,600 ft) cliffs of Riva Ridge. Had the Germans learned of this night climb, American command estimated as many as 90% of the regiment would become casualties. Fortunately for the battalion, they reached the top undetected by the enemy. Compounding the German's difficulties, at the time of the ascent the men of the 1044th Grenadier regiment were in the process of being relieved by the men of the 232nd Fusilier battalion, a distraction further enabling the American capture of Riva Ridge. As daylight broke, the Germans discovered the presence of the 86th Mountain Infantry and attempted to push the Americans off the ridge. While the Americans held their positions, the fighting was heaviest at the northern end of the ridge where two German companies over a period of 36 hours repeatedly attacked the single American platoon holding Pizzo di Campiano, however failing to dislodge the platoon.

With Riva Ridge secure, the following night (19/20 February) the other two regiments of the division began their frontal assault on German lines: the 87th Mountain Infantry Regiment advanced on the western slopes of Mount Belvedere, while the 85th Mountain Infantry Regiment advanced up the southern slopes. To achieve maximum surprise, no preliminary artillery barrage was made. The third battalion of the 86th Mountain Infantry advanced to the right of the 85th Mountain Infantry. Despite minefields and emplaced machine gun positions, the 87th Mountain captured two of the three villages on the western slopes, as well as the Valpiana Ridge, by dawn. Meanwhile the 85th Mountain Infantry had reached the top of Mount Belvedere between 3:30a and 5:30a 20 February, and one battalion of the 85th Mountain Infantry reached the summit of neighboring Mount Gorgolesco by 3:00a.

The German 114th Jäger division was frustrated in its advance to the front lines and assist the 232nd Grenadier Infantry division against the Americans by repeated sorties of Allied fighter bombers. Soldiers were only able to advance 300-400 meters between each sortie.

The last peak of the chain of mountains — Mount della Torraccia — remained to be taken. For this part of the battle, General Hays brought in the artillery assets, while British Spitfires and American P-47s were coordinated by ground spotters dubbed "Rover Joe". However, supported by the recently arrived 741st Jäger Regiment, of the 114th Jäger division, on 21 February units of the 232nd Infantry Division launched a fierce counterattack on Mount Belvedere that stopped the American advance down the reverse slope but failed to gain any ground. The second battalion of the 85th Mountain Infantry began their advance along the ridgeline from Mt. Gorgolesco towards Mount della Torraccio, only to be stopped some 400 yards short of their objective by the Germans' effective use of artillery. By the afternoon of 22 February the battalion was down to 400 effectives; General Hays relieved their commander, and sent the third battalion of the 86th Mountain Infantry in their place. Following an artillery barrage of the German positions on Mount della Torraccio, on 24 February the third battalion moved forward to seize the summit of the mountain in hand-to-hand combat by 9:00am. The German Mittenwald Mountain Training Battalion initiated counterattacks on the afternoon of that day that continued into the night, but failed to dislodge the men of the 86th Mountain Infantry.

Meanwhile, the BEF pressed forward with the final assault on Monte Castello, located south of Monte della Torraccia, capturing the summit on February 21 after more than twelve hours of fierce combat against the German 232nd Infantry Division. German forces retreated to neighboring defensive positions only after their front lines were broken by the Brazilian infantry.

A five-day period of relative peace intervened before the advance towards the Po resumed. Some select men were sent from the front to nearby rest camps; some of the others in the line were visited by Red Cross donut girls who handed out pastries to men surprised to see them so close to the front.

American casualties from the Battle of Mount Belvedere were 192 killed in action, 730 wounded, and 1 captured. Brazilian casualties were 22 dead and 137 wounded. German casualties are unknown, but American records note over 400 were taken prisoner. (Note: Isserman admits that "German casualties are unknown". Any estimate of number of German casualties would be based on compilation of incidental mentions of Germans killed in the various sources, which potentially duplicate counts and have different degrees of reliability. For example, in this battle Hampton's official report on the capture of Riva Ridge, he states the number of Germans killed in their assaults on Monte Pizzo di Campiano was 30 KIA and 3 captured; however Boucsein in his book states the Germans suffered 35 casualties, an additional 26 killed and a total of 10 captured. There is the statement that by the morning of 21 February following the assault of the 87th regiment on the west slopes of Mt. Belvedere, "over one hundred enemy dead lay among our positions." A third figure is that when the third battalion of the 86th Mountain Infantry, assaulted enemy positions on Mount della Torraccia, Lt. Col. John Hay reports "more than fifty Germans" had been killed.)

== Battle of Castel D'Aiano ==
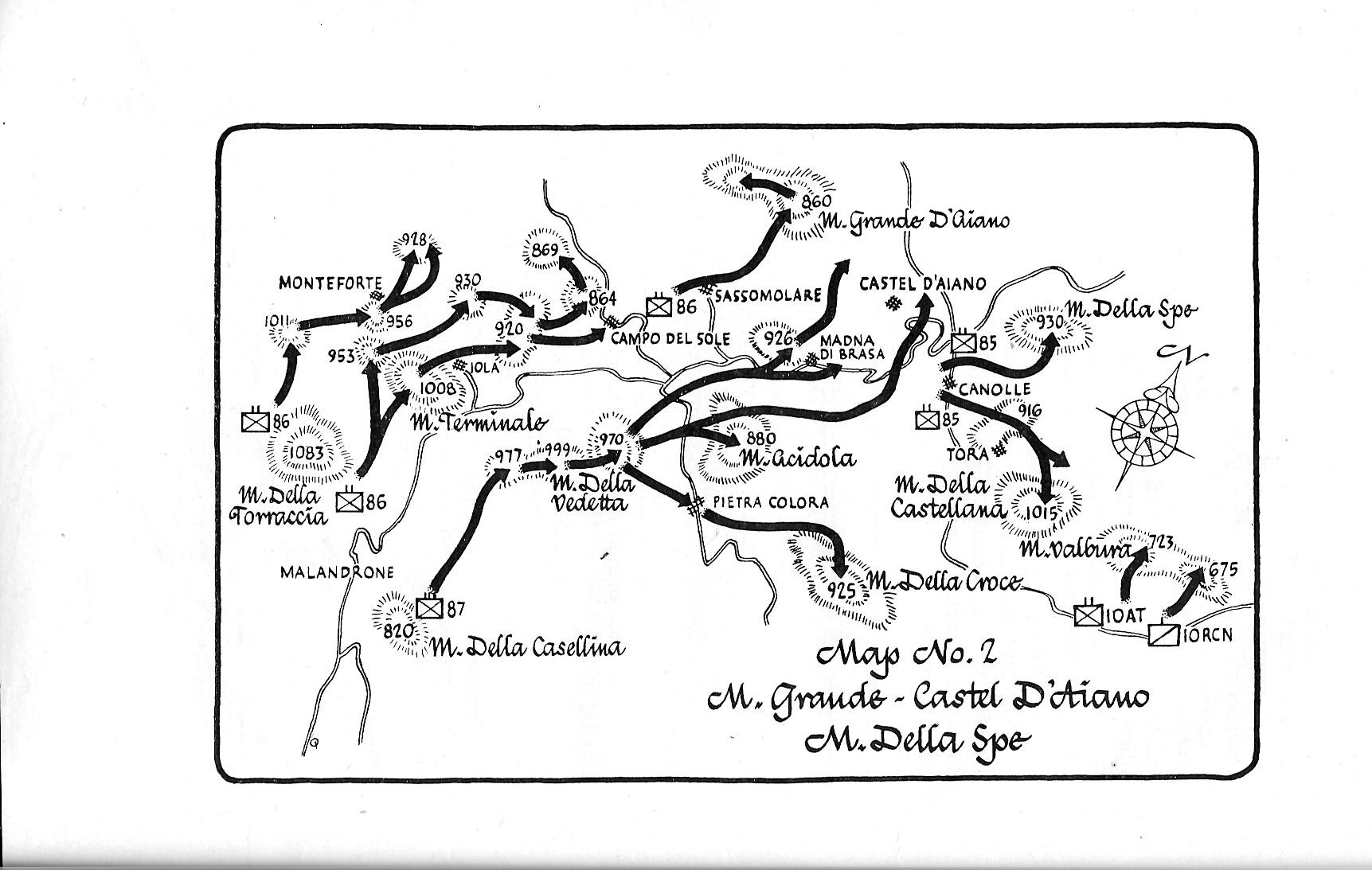
Map of the 10th Mountain Division's Advance to Castel D'Aiano

The second phase of Operation Encore began five days later. The American 10th Mountain would advance north, with the 86th Mountain Infantry on the left and the 87th Mountain Infantry on the right, to occupy four peaks that would serve as their line of departure for Operation Craftsman; the 85th Mountain Infantry would be kept in reserve. From west to east the peaks were Mount Grande d'Aiano, Mount della Spe, Mount della Castellana, and Mount Valbura. To their right the BEF would advance to the northeast to occupy Vergato which lay on Strada statale 64 Porrettana; occupying this town would sever both the German lines of supply and communications back to the Po valley.

Lieutenant General Lucian Truscott, who had replaced General Clark as commander of the Fifth Army the previous December, had wanted to begin the advance on 1 March, but inclement weather prevented air support until 3 March, when the attack started. Unlike the previous assault on Mt. Belvedere the previous month, which started at night, this attack would begin in full daylight. Nevertheless, the attack took the Germans by surprise: elements of the 114th Jäger Division were relieving the 232nd Infantry Division at the time of the attack. The 86th Mountain Infantry quickly seized Mount Terminale, then proceeded to the town of Iola di Montese, where they encountered stiff resistance; the town was captured with the help of the 751st Tank battalion. In the fighting for Iola, Technical Sargeant Torger Tokle, a champion skier and the best known member of the division, was killed. On the right the 87th Mountain Infantry captured the town of Pietra Colora on the first day. Amongst the prisoners was the headquarters staff of the third battalion, 721st regiment, 114th Jäger Division.

The following day the 86th Mountain Infantry captured the town of Sassomolare, and shortly before 3:30pm was in control of their final objective, Mount Grande d'Aiano. Meanwhile on the right the 87th Mountain Infantry captured Mounts Acidola and della Croce, and occupied Castel d'Aiano. The 85th Mountain Infantry came out of reserve, capturing Mounts della Spe and della Castellana despite heavy German artillery barrages. Meanwhile the BEF advanced west of Highway 64. German General von Gablenz was forced to pull men from the 232nd Division which had been relieved the night before to stem the American advance; one German POW complained, "I don't mind being taken prisoner, but I surely hate losing out on my rest."

The American success concerned German Field Marshal Albert Kesselring, who suspected this was the beginning of a major offensive aimed to capture Bologna. He decided he could not take a chance and committed his strategic reserve, the 29th Panzer Grenadier Division. Its first unit, the 15th Panzer Grenadier regiment, upon arrival initiated a series of counterattacks against the soldiers dug in on Mount della Spe. Despite the ferocity of the German counterattacks, the men of the 86th Mountain Infantry beat them back in determined hand-to-hand fighting, and the Germans settled on harassing them with artillery fire. According to Peter Shelton, the artillery barrage lasted almost two weeks, and was especially hard on the troops there.

Although both generals Hays and Crittenberger were eager to continue to push out of the Apennines and capture Bologna, on March 5 Lieutenant General Truscott, worried that Kesselring might grow concerned enough to develop defensive positions astride Strada statale 64, ordered the units to halt in place. The 10th Mountain extended their control over two additional features to the east, Mount Valbura and a second Mount Belvedere. Meanwhile, between 10 and 16 March the BEF shifted their position to the left of the 10th Mountain, transferring its headquarters to the valley of the Panaro. The Allies now held a six-mile front favorable for their advance down the valley of the Reno river and along the Strada statale 64 into the plains of the Po river.

American casualties from the Battle of Castel d'Aiano were 146 killed in action, 512 wounded, and 3 captured; a major source of casualties was at the aid station set up in the village of Abetaia, where a booby trap was set off killing not only the staff and patients but all 3 chaplains of the 87th Mountain Infantry. Brazilian casualties were 68 in total, of which at least 3 were killed in action and 32 wounded. Six hundred German soldiers were taken prisoners; although the number of German soldiers killed is unknown, their losses were serious, and at this point in the war could not easily be replaced. By the end of March the 114th Jäger Division had less than a thousand front-line soldiers. Casualties forced the 232nd Division to disband its 1043rd Grenadier Regiment and distribute its men between the other two regiments.

== Reaction to the victory ==
Based on their experiences at Cassino, Allied command had expected it would take two weeks to drive the Germans off Mount Belvedere; instead the division completed their mission in 10 days. For their achievements in Operation Encore, the entire 10th Mountain Division received commendations from Field Marshal Harold Alexander, Lieutenant Generals Joseph McNarney, Mark Clark, Truscott, and Crittenberger.

== See also ==
- Battle of Monte Castello
