= Battle of Monte Castello =

Battle of World War II

Coordinates: 44°13′18.5″N 10°57′15.2″E

- Part of the Gothic Line Offensive during the Italian campaign of World War II
- Brazilian infantry of the FEB preparing for an assault near Monte Castello
Date	25 November 1944 – 21 February 1945
Location	Monte Castello, Italy
Result	Allied victory

Belligerents
(Vargas Era) Brazil; United States	Germany

Commanders and leaders
Mascarenhas de Morais; Willis D. Crittenberger; George Price Hays	Eccard von Gablenz

Strength
(Vargas Era) 1st Brazilian Division; (Vargas Era) 1st Fighter Aviation Group; (United States) 10th Mountain Division; (United States) Task Force 45	(Nazi Germany) 232nd Infantry Division

Casualties and losses
(Vargas Era) 417+ dead and wounded, 8 POWs; (United States) ~950 dead and wounded (10th Mountain)	(Nazi Germany) Unknown dead and wounded 23+ taken as POWs

The Battle of Monte Castello (Italian: Battaglia del Monte Castello; German: Schlacht von Monte Castello; Portuguese: Batalha de Monte Castello) was a major engagement fought between 25 November 1944 and 21 February 1945 during the Italian campaign of World War II.

Fought in the northern Apennine Mountains, the battle pitted the advancing Allied forces—primarily the Brazilian Expeditionary Force (Força Expedicionária Brasileira – FEB) alongside the US 10th Mountain Division—against heavily entrenched defenders of the Wehrmacht's 232nd Infantry Division. After four preliminary assaults between November and December 1944 were halted by severe winter conditions, heavy artillery fire, and steep terrain, the Allied forces launched a coordinated joint offensive (Operation Encore) in February 1945, resulting in the Brazilian 1st Division successfully capturing the summit on 21 February 1945.

== Location ==
Monte Castello is a hill located about 48 km (30 mi) north of Pistoia (Tuscany) and 60 km (37 mi) southwest of Bologna (Emilia-Romagna), via Località Abetaia (SP623), near Abetaia di Gaggio Montano with an altitude of 977 m (3,205 ft), in the Northern Apennines on the border between Tuscany and Emilia-Romagna regions. This mountain controlled access to Strada statale 64 Porrettana, the all-weather link between Pistoia and Bologna. Once held, this would provide the Allies the passage needed to capture Bologna before the onset of the winter snows.

== Operation ==
In November 1944, the 1st Infantry Division of the Brazilian Expeditionary Force (FEB) was shifted from the Serchio River valley, where it had been operating for two months, to the Reno River sector in the Northern Apennine Mountains. General Mascarenhas de Moraes established his forward headquarters in the town of Porretta Terme, directly facing the German-controlled mountain ridges across a perimeter with a radius of approximately 15 km (9.3 mi).

The German artillery positions atop Monte Castello and adjacent peaks enjoyed commanding views of the region, allowing observers to direct accurate fire on Allied movements and blocking any potential advance along Highway 64 toward Bologna and the Po Valley. Command estimates warned that a harsh winter was approaching, compounding difficulties on ground already saturated by heavy rains and air bombardment, which had turned the mountain roads into quagmires.

Despite these environmental hazards, General Mark W. Clark, commander of the 15th Army Group, instructed the US IV Corps, to which the Brazilian division was attached, to launch an offensive to secure the mountain passes and clear the approach to Bologna before the heaviest winter snows began.

== German forces ==
Axis forces in Italy were controlled by Army Group C, commanded by Generaloberst Heinrich von Vietinghoff. The command oversaw the German 10th and 14th Armies, as well as the Army of Liguria. The 14th Army comprised the 14th Panzer Corps and the 51st Mountain Corps.

The 51st Mountain Corps included the 232nd Infantry Division, commanded by Generalleutnant Eccard Freiherr von Gablenz. Activated in June 1944, the 232nd was classified as a static division and largely manned by personnel recovering from wounds sustained on the Eastern Front. The division consisted of three infantry regiments (the 1043rd, 1044th, and 1045th), each containing two battalions, a fusilier (reconnaissance) battalion, an artillery regiment with four batteries, and supporting elements, totaling approximately 9,000 personnel. Personnel ages ranged from 17 to 40, with younger troops concentrated in the fusilier unit. During the final phase of the battle, the division was reinforced by the 4th Mountain Battalion (Mittenwald).

== The attack ==
The 1st Infantry Division of the Brazilian Expeditionary Force (FEB) was assigned to the central sector of the Apennine front despite lacking prior experience in large-scale mountain warfare. Due to command directives to secure the region before winter, training was conducted concurrently with operational deployment. Deliveries of standard equipment to the division remained incomplete as of 18 November 1944.

On 24 November, the Reconnaissance Squadron and the 3rd Battalion, 6th Infantry Regiment of the 1st Division joined US Task Force 45 under Brigadier General Paul W. Rutledge for an initial reconnaissance in force toward Monte Castello. US forces captured adjacent Mount Belvedere during the action. However, a counterattack by the German 232nd Infantry Division forced Allied troops to withdraw from Monte Castello while retaining Mount Belvedere.

A second attack was conducted on 29 November using three Brazilian battalions supported by three platoons of US armor. On the night of 28 November, German forces launched a counteroffensive that recaptured Mount Belvedere, leaving the Allied left flank exposed.

Brazilian commanders proceeded with the planned attack on 29 November at 07:00. Inclement weather prevented tactical air support, while muddy conditions restricted armored maneuvers. Infantry units under General Zenóbio da Costa were repulsed by defensive fire from the German 1043rd, 1044th, and 1045th Infantry Regiments. By late afternoon, Allied troops withdrew to their initial positions, incurring 190 casualties.

On 5 December, US IV Corps ordered the 1st Division to capture the summit of Monte della Torraccia and Monte Belvedere. The operation was scheduled following a one-week delay.

On 12 December 1944, the 2nd and 3rd Battalions of the 1st Infantry Regiment executed a third assault under poor weather conditions. German artillery fire halted the advance, resulting in 150 casualties, including 20 killed. Following this action, General Mascarenhas de Morais concluded that capturing the summit required a full divisional attack rather than battalion-level actions.

On 18 February 1945, Fifth Army command initiated Operation Encore, a joint offensive designed to clear German positions at Monte Castello, Belvedere, Della Torraccia, Castelnuovo, Torre di Nerone, and Castel d'Aiano. The assault was assigned to the 1st Brazilian Division operating alongside the US 10th Mountain Division.

== Operation Encore ==
The final assault on Monte Castello was incorporated into Operation Encore, employing the same divisional attack plan previously proposed by General Mascarenhas de Morais. By 20 February 1945, the 1st Infantry Division of the Brazilian Expeditionary Force (FEB) had deployed its three infantry regiments into position. Operating on the left flank, the US 10th Mountain Division was tasked with capturing Monte della Torraccia to secure the sector's western approach.

The main assault began at 06:00 on 21 February. The FEB advanced with the 1st Infantry Regiment's 1st Battalion (under Major Franklin) leading the frontal attack, supported on the right by the 2nd Battalion (under Major Uzeda), while the 3rd Battalion (under Major Sizeno Sarmento) moved from forward positions reached overnight to join the assault. Under the operational plan, Brazilian forces were scheduled to secure the summit by 18:00, following the planned capture of Monte della Torraccia by the 10th Mountain Division at 17:00.

Brazilian infantry reached the summit of Monte Castello at 17:30, prior to the reduction of German defenses at Monte della Torraccia, which US forces secured later that evening. Brazilian units subsequently established defensive positions in captured bunkers and fortifications. The advance was supported by artillery fire from the FEB Divisional Artillery under General Oswaldo Cordeiro de Farias, which delivered a concentrated barrage on German positions between 16:00 and 17:00 on 21 February.

== See also ==
- Battle of Collecchio
- Batalha do Monte Castelo, Jornal O Globo.

== Bibliography ==
- Baumgardner, Randy W. 10th Mountain Division Turner Publishing Co. ISBN 9781563114304
- Böhmler, Rudolf (1964). Monte Cassino: A German View. London: Cassell. ASIN B000MMKAYM.
- Brooks, Thomas R. (2003). The War North of Rome (June 1944 – May 1945). Da Capo Press. ISBN 9780306812569.
- Donato, Hernâni. Dicionário das Batalhas Brasileiras ('Dictionary of Brazilian Battles') (in Portuguese) IBRASA, 1987 ISBN 8534800340
- Moraes, Mascarenhas de (1966). The Brazilian Expeditionary Force by Its Commander. US Government Printing Office. ASIN B000PIBXCG.
