= John D. Magrath =

United States Army Medal of Honor recipient

- Born: July 4, 1924; East Norwalk, Connecticut
- Died: April 14, 1945 (aged 20) near Castel d'Aiano, Italy
- Burial place: Riverside Cemetery, Norwalk, Connecticut
- Military career
- Allegiance: United States of America
- Branch: United States Army
- Service years: 1943–1945
- Rank: Private First Class
- Units: Company G, 2nd Battalion, 85th Infantry, 10th Mountain Division
- Conflicts: World War II
- Awards: Medal of Honor; Bronze Star; Purple Heart

John David Magrath (July 4, 1924 – April 14, 1945) was a soldier in the U.S. Army who posthumously received the Medal of Honor for his heroic actions and sacrifice of life during World War II for actions occurring in Italy on April 14, 1945. He served in the 10th Mountain Division. The Shea-Magrath Sports Complex at Norwalk High School in Connecticut is named for him. In June 1995, Fort Drum, New York renamed its Soldiers Sports Complex the Magrath Sports Complex. A plaque and portrait are in display Magrath Gym to honor his memory.

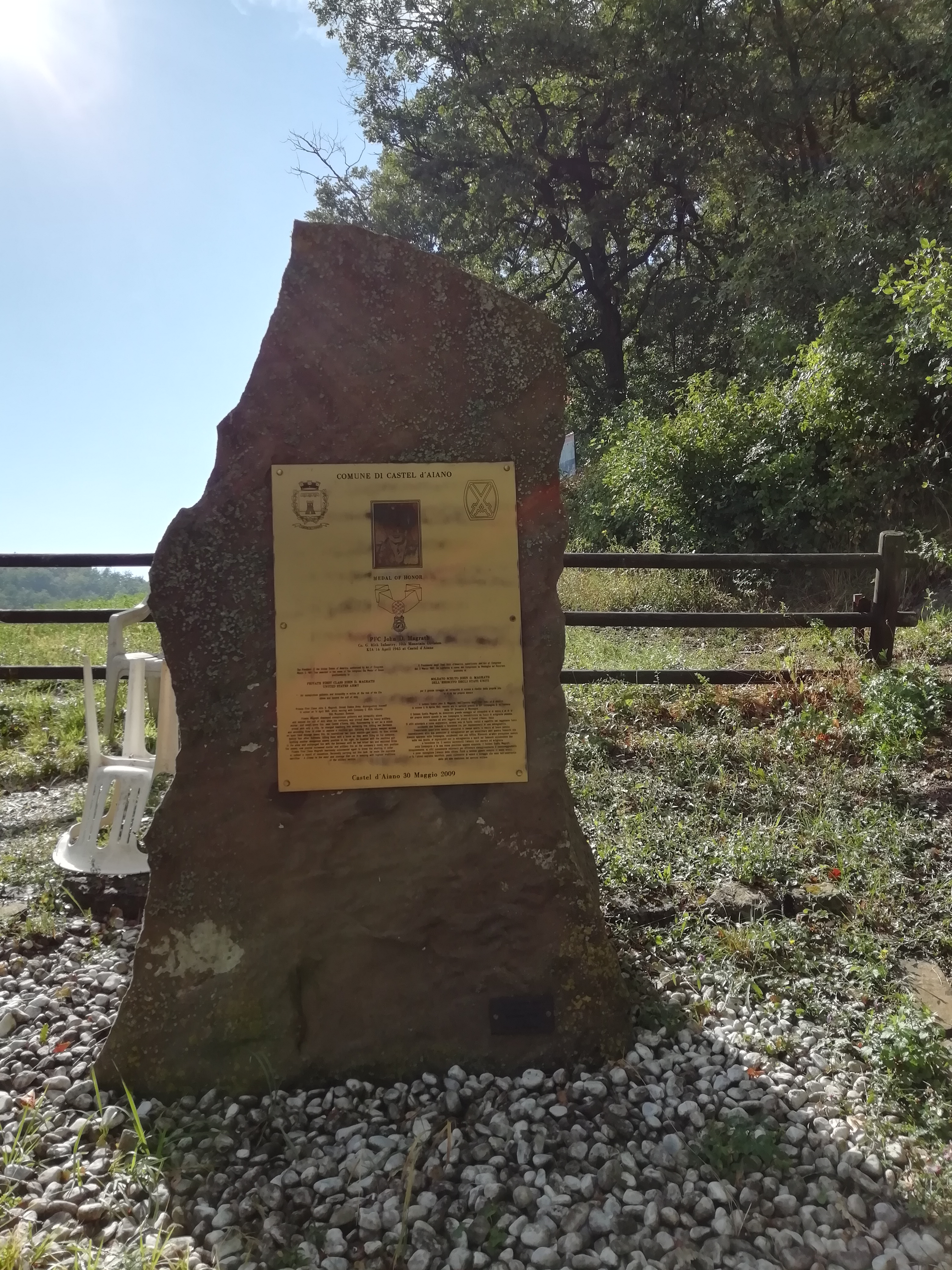
Monument to John D. Magrath, in Castel d'Aiano, Italy

In August 2013 the dedication of a monument and plaque in his honor was placed at the location of the battle by residents of Castel d'Aiano.

Magrath was born in the East Norwalk section of Norwalk, Connecticut on July 4, 1924. He enlisted in the Army from East Norwalk in March 1943. He was killed in action in Italy at age 20.

PFC John D. Magrath is the first Medal of Honor recipient of the 10th Mountain Division.

== Medal of Honor citation ==
Private First Class Magrath's official Medal of Honor citation, awarded July 17, 1946, reads:

He displayed conspicuous gallantry and intrepidity above and beyond the call of duty when his company was pinned down by heavy artillery, mortar, and small arms fire, near Castel d'Aiano, Italy. Volunteering to act as a scout, armed with only a rifle, he charged headlong into withering fire, killing 2 Germans and wounding 3 in order to capture a machinegun. Carrying this enemy weapon across an open field through heavy fire, he neutralized 2 more machinegun nests; he then circled behind 4 other Germans, killing them with a burst as they were firing on his company. Spotting another dangerous enemy position to this right, he knelt with the machinegun in his arms and exchanged fire with the Germans until he had killed 2 and wounded 3. The enemy now poured increased mortar and artillery fire on the company's newly won position. Pfc. Magrath fearlessly volunteered again to brave the shelling in order to collect a report of casualties. Heroically carrying out this task, he made the supreme sacrifice—a climax to the valor and courage that are in keeping with highest traditions of the military service.

== Awards and decorations ==
Magrath was awarded the following throughout his military career:

| Badge | Combat Infantryman Badge | | |
| 1st row | Medal of Honor | | |
| 2nd row | Bronze Star Medal | Purple Heart | Army Good Conduct Medal |
| 3rd row | American Campaign Medal | European–African–Middle Eastern Campaign Medal with 1 Campaign star | World War II Victory Medal |

== See also ==
- List of Medal of Honor recipients for World War II
- Spring 1945 offensive in Italy
