= Eccard Freiherr von Gablenz =

German Wehrmacht general

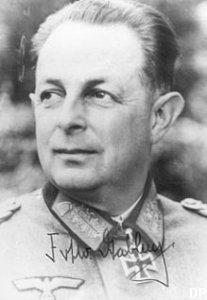
- von Gablenz in 1944
- Born: 26 January 1891
- Died: 17 December 1978 (aged 87)
- Military career
- Allegiance: German Empire; Weimar Republic; Nazi Germany
- Branch: Heer
- Rank: Generalleutnant
- Commands: 32. Infanterie-Division; 7. Infanterie-Division; XXVII. Armeekorps; 384. Infanterie-Division; 404. Infanterie-Division; 232. Infanterie-Division
- Conflicts: World War II
- Awards: Knight's Cross of the Iron Cross

Eccard Freiherr von Gablenz (26 January 1891 – 17 December 1978) was a German general in the Wehrmacht during World War II who commanded several divisions. He participated in the campaigns of Poland, France and the invasion of the Soviet Union. Gablenz stayed on the Russian Front from 1941 to 1943. He later assumed command of the 232nd Infantry Division in Italy, a command he held until the final surrender in May 1945.

He was a recipient of the Knight's Cross of the Iron Cross of Nazi Germany.

== Early career ==
Baron von Gablenz joined the 1st (Emperor Alexander) Guards Grenadiers (Kaiser Alexander Garde-Grenadier-Regiment Nr. 1) as an officer cadet (Fahnenjunker) at the beginning of April 1910 and was promoted to lieutenant (Leutnant) on 18 August 1911 with a patent from 20 August 1909. He served as an officer in 1912, among other things, as a regimental adjutant, in the First World War among other things on the staff of the Chief of the General Staff of the Field Army (Stab des Chefs des Generalstabes des Feldheeres).

After the end of the war von Gablenz was retained as a captain (Hauptmann) in the Reichswehr, initially from 1921 as chief of the 12th MG Company (12. MG-Kompanie) in the 9th (Prussian) Infantry Regiment (9. (Preußisches) Infanterie-Regiment); future Infantry Regiment 9 Potsdam. From 1925 to 1927 he was a regimental adjutant in Infantry Regiment 9. On January 1, 1929 he was promoted to major and took over the 3rd Battalion of his regiment. In 1931 he was in command of Military District II, responsible for border protection in the Grenzmark. Promoted to lieutenant colonel (Oberstleutnant) in April 1933, he became a colonel (Oberst) exactly two years later.

From 1 December 1935 to 23 November 1938 he was in command of the Paderborn Infantry Regiment, later the 18th Infantry Regiment. On August 1, 1938, von Gablenz was promoted to major general. Then he was initially in command of Army Service 5 (Heeresdienststelle 5) in Dresden, which was responsible for the border section to Czechoslovakia.

On 15 March 1939, the day of the German annexation of Czechoslovakia, Radola Gajda contacted von Gablenz and promised him loyalty and cooperation. The reason for this was that von Gablenz became commandant of Prague from April 1939. However, it was later pointed out to Gajda that he was not an official representative, and contact was broken off. For a short time he was the commander of the Combat Group Netze (Kampfgruppe Netze, also known as Brigade Netze), which had been formed in September 1939 from the Border Guard Section Command 2 (Grenzschutz-Abschnittskommando 2), and was temporarily also the local commander of Bromberg.

== World War II ==
From October 1939 to December 1939 he was commander of the 32nd Infantry Division, taking part in the attack on Poland. With the transfer of the division from Poland to the Eifel, von Gablenz officially gave up command. In August 1939 the brigade was transferred to the briefly existing 301st Infantry Division. Then until December 13, 1941 he was commander of the 7th Infantry Division. On 1 August 1940, he was promoted to lieutenant general (Generalleutnant) in this position. On 21 June 1941, he gave the following speech to his soldiers:

"Soldiers of the 7th Division! The Führer has given the order to attack. We want to uphold the reputation of our division in an iron fulfillment of our duties and attach new fame and honor to our flags. The enemy fears us; we will destroy him where we meet him. I wish you soldiers luck and I have trust in you. Our old watchword is: 'Forward, approach the enemy!' Long live our people, long live the Führer!"

After he discovered, at the end of July 1941, that the German soldiers were looting contrary to the orders, von Gablenz gave the order to use the harvest to refresh the unit's food stores; which was followed by mid-August 1941. From late August to mid-September 1941, the division was involved in the Roslavl-Novosybkov operation.

In December 1941 he took over the XXVII Army Corps near Moscow and resigned from the command in early January 1942 in protest because of Hitler's order to halt. He could not answer for the responsibility for the rapid destruction of his troops and asked to be brought before a court martial. His divisional court suspended the execution of sentences for probation at the front.

From 13 February 1942 to 16 January 1943 he was commander of the 384th Infantry Division. Shortly before the division was encircled in the Stalingrad pocket, von Gablenz was flown out with the staff. From mid-March 1943 to June 1944 he took over the 404th Infantry Division, which was responsible for the replacement troops in Military District IV (Dresden). He was then the sole commander of the 232nd Infantry Division, the former Wildflecken Infantry Division, until the end of the war. This division was deployed in Italy around Brescia and Milan. On 25 April 1945 the division was the only division of the forces commanded by Marshal Graziani to escape the American encirclement. A week later, however, the division surrendered and von Glabenz became a prisoner of war of the Americans.

== Post-war ==
In 1957 he lived in Mönckeberg. In July 1960, the GDR Defense Ministry was considering organizing a meeting with von Gablenz and the critically inclined former Colonel Bogislaw von Bonin through the contact of Vincenz Müller, which should include an exchange on the policy of the then Defense Minister Franz Strauss. A meeting was ultimately not scheduled.

== Family ==
Eccard von Gablenz was married to Orlanda, née Caprivi.

== Commands ==
During the German retreat during the Battle of Moscow, he commanded the XXVII. Armeekorps and was relieved of duty after repeated refusals to enforce Hitler's standfast orders.

As commander of the 384th Infantry Division, he was flown out of the Stalingrad pocket in December 1942, shortly before the division's surrender. A contemporary Soviet press report described him as having liked his peacetime comforts, such as requiring a nap on a soft bed after every dinner. Von Gablenz went on to hold command on the Italian front, commanding the defense of Monte Castello in 1944.

== Awards and decorations ==
- Iron Cross (1914), 2nd Class and 1st Class
- Honour Cross of the World War 1914/1918
- Iron Cross (1939), 2nd Class and 1st Class
- Eastern Front Medal
- Knight's Cross of the Iron Cross on 15 August 1940 as Generalleutnant and commander of 7. Infanterie-Division

Military offices
Preceded by Generalleutnant Franz Böhme	Commander of 32. Infanterie-Division; 1 October 1939 – 1 December 1939	Succeeded by Generalleutnant Franz Böhme
Preceded by Generalmajor Eberhardt Bohnstedt	Commander of 7. Infanterie-Division; 1 December 1939 – 13 December 1941	Succeeded by Generalmajor Hans Jordan
Preceded by General der Infanterie Alfred Wäger	Commander of XXVII. Armeekorps; 24 December 1941 – 3 January 1942	Succeeded by General der Infanterie Joachim Witthöft
Preceded by Generalleutnant Kurt Hoffman	Commander of 384. Infanterie-Division; 13 February 1942 – 16 January 1943	Succeeded by Generalmajor Hans Dorr
Preceded by None	Commander of 232. Infanterie-Division; 26 June 1944 – May 1945	Succeeded by None
