= Italian campaign (World War II) =

1943–1945 military campaign in mainland Italy

- Part of the Mediterranean and European theatres of World War II
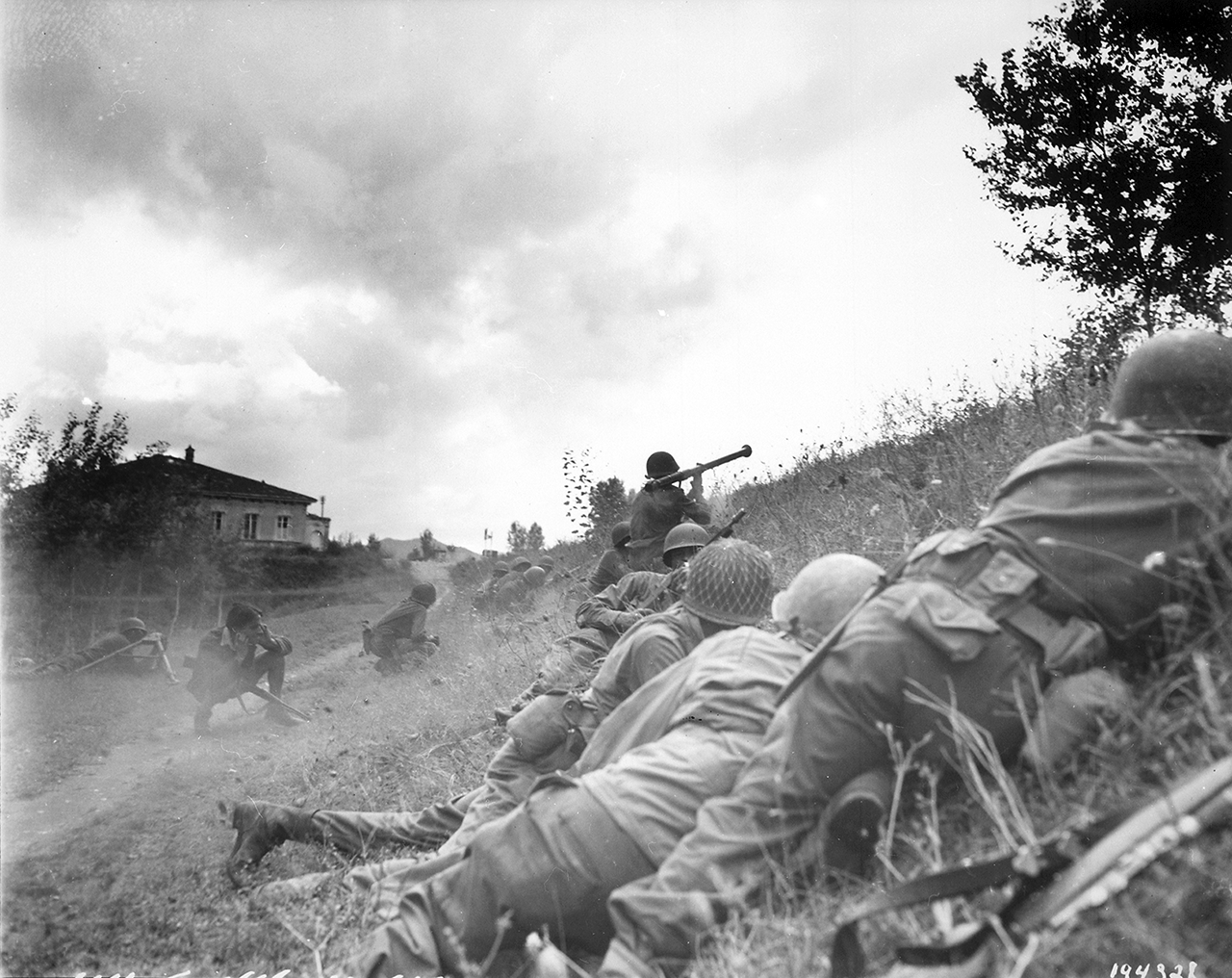
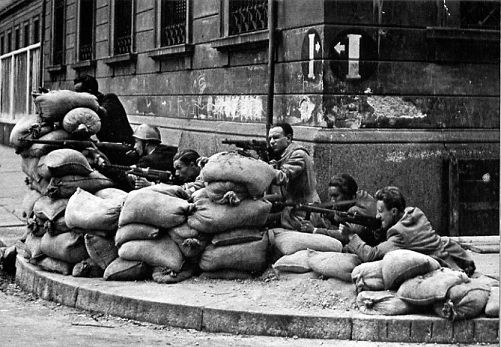
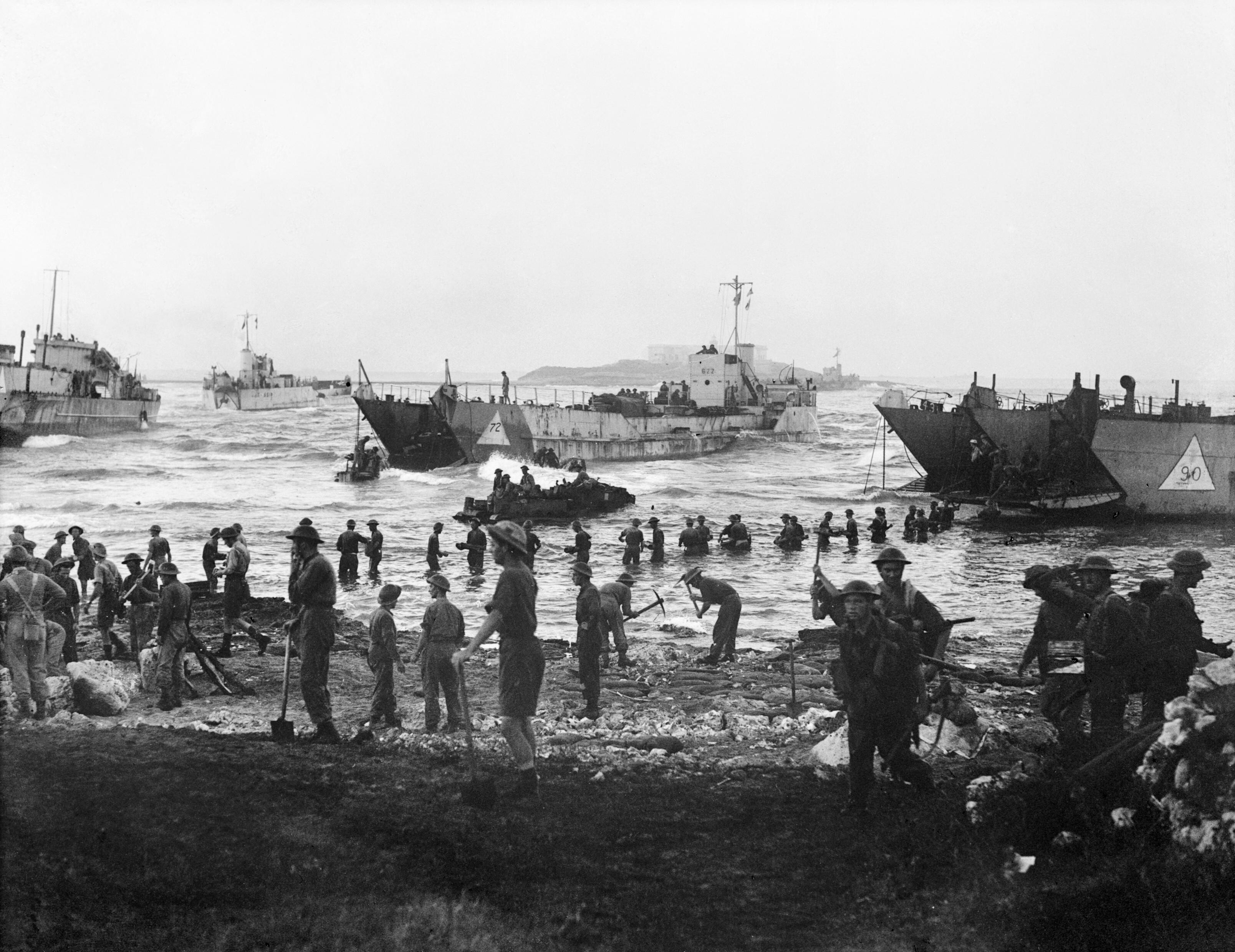
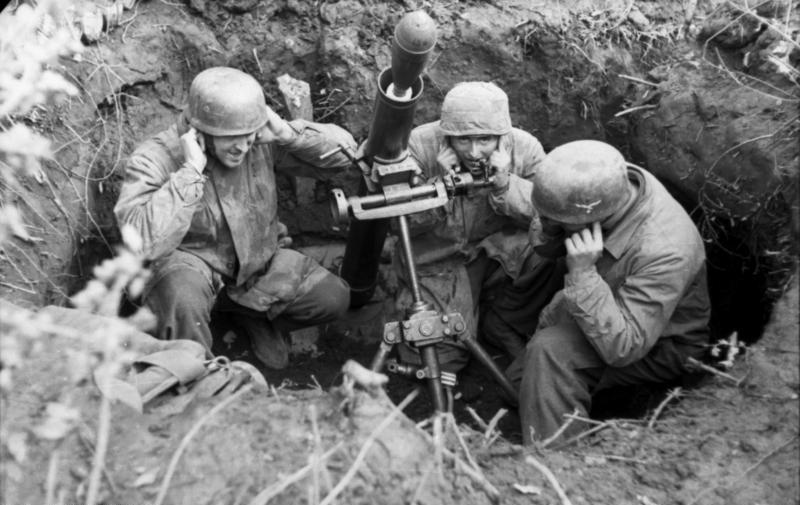
- Clockwise from top left: American soldiers fire a bazooka at a German machine gun nest in Lucca; Italian partisans fighting in Milan; German paratroopers during the Battle of Monte Cassino; British forces invading Sicily
Date	9 July 1943 – 3 May 1945 (1 year, 9 months, 3 weeks and 2 days)
Location	Italy, San Marino, Vatican City
Result	Allied victory

Belligerents
Allies: United States; United Kingdom • Newfoundland • Palestine • India (Note: Including Nepali Gurkhas in the British Indian Army.); France (Note: Free France until June 1944.); Canada; Australia; South Africa; New Zealand; Greece; Poland (from Feb. 1944); Brazil (from Jul. 1944); Yugoslavia (Note: While not taking part in the main front, Yugoslav Forces fought the Axis forces in Istria, a territory once ruled by the Fascist-led Kingdom of Italy before Operation Achse in 1943. Subsequently, Yugoslav forces continued to engage Axis forces across the territory of the Operational Zone of the Adriatic Littoral, from 1943-1945. The Yugoslav forces also took part in the 1945 Race for Trieste, linking up with the New Zealander forces and liberating Trieste from the Axis.) Co-belligerents: Italian Resistance (from Sep. 1943); Italy (from Oct. 1943) (Note: Kingdom of the South until June 1944.)	Axis: Germany • Italian Social Republic (from Sep. 1943) • Bohemia & Moravia (from May 1944) (Note: In May 1944, eleven out of the total twelve battalion strong Protectorate Government Army (5,002 soldiers, including 272 officers) were moved to northern Italy to support German military operations there. Responsibilities were limited to a passive role in the construction of fortifications and field positions. Approximately 600 soldiers deserted to the Italian partisans, due in part to the effects of the propaganda campaign Operation Sauerkraut of the US Office of Strategic Services.) • Kosakenland (from Jul. 1944) (Note: Semi-independent military government under the Kazachi Stan subordinate to the Operational Zone of the Adriatic Littoral.); Italy (until Sep. 1943); Croatia (1943) (Note: Participated in Operation Achse in 1943.); Romania (1943); Serbia (1945) (Note: Even though the puppet government in Serbia ended in October 1944 after the Belgrade offensive, remnants of its paramilitary groups continued to fight for the Axis and even fought in the Race for Trieste in May 1945.); Chetniks (1945) (Note: Participated in the Race for Trieste in 1945.)

Commanders and leaders
(United States) Dwight D. Eisenhower; (United Kingdom) Henry Wilson; (United Kingdom) Harold Alexander; (United States) Mark W. Clark	(Nazi Germany) Albert Kesselring; (Nazi Germany) Heinrich von Vietinghoff; (Kingdom of Italy) (Italian Social Republic) Benito Mussolini (executed); (Kingdom of Italy) Vittorio Ambrosio (until Sept. 1943); (Italian Social Republic) Rodolfo Graziani

Strength
May 1944: 619,947 men (ration strength); April 1945: 616,642 men (ration strength); 1,333,856 men (overall strength); Aircraft: 3,127 aircraft (September 1943); 4,000 aircraft (March 1945)	May 1944: (Nazi Germany) 365,616 men (ration strength); April 1945: (Nazi Germany) 332,524 men (ration strength) (Nazi Germany) 439,224 men (overall strength) (Italian Social Republic) 160,180 men (military only); Aircraft: (Nazi Germany) 722 aircraft (September 1943) (Nazi Germany) 79 aircraft (April 1945)

Casualties and losses
Sicily: 24,900 casualties Italian mainland: (Note: Ellis provides the following information on Allied losses for the campaign, but includes no dates. American: 29,560 killed and missing, 82,180 wounded, 7,410 captured; British: 89,440 killed, wounded, or missing, no information is provided on those captured; Indian: 4,720 killed or missing, 17,310 wounded, and 46 captured; Canadian: 5,400 killed or missing, 19,490 wounded, and 1,000 captured; Pole: 2,460 killed or missing, 8,460 wounded, no information is provided for those captured; South African: 710 killed or missing, 2,670 wounded, and 160 captured; French: 8,600 killed or missing, 23,510 wounded, no information is provided on those captured; Brazilian: 510 killed or missing, 1,900 wounded, no information is provided on those captured; New Zealand: no information is provided for the campaign.) (Note: United States: 114,000 casualties; British Commonwealth: 198,000 casualties Total Allied casualties: 59,151 killed, 30,849 missing and 230,000 wounded.) (Note: American: 119,279 casualties; Brazilian: 2,211 casualties; British: 89,436 casualties; British Colonial troops: 448 casualties; Canadian: 25,889 casualties; French: 27,625 casualties; Greeks: 452 casualties; Indian, 19,373 casualties; Italian: 4,729 casualties; New Zealand; 8,668 casualties; Polish: 11,217 casualties; South African: 4,168 casualties.) (United States) 119,200 (United Kingdom) 89,440; 35,000 (Free France) (Provisional Government of the French Republic) 32,171 (Canada) 25,890 (British Raj) 20,000 (Polish government-in-exile) 11,000 (Dominion of New Zealand) 8,668 (Kingdom of Italy) 5,927 (Union of South Africa) 3,860 (Vargas Era) 2,300 (Kingdom of Greece) 452; Total: 358,295–376,637 casualties Vehicles: 8,011 aircraft destroyed (United States) 3,377 armoured vehicles destroyed	Sicily: (Kingdom of Italy) 150,000 (Nazi Germany) 27,940 (Nazi Germany) (Kingdom of Italy) 14,100 (Note: Sicily: 5,000 battle dead, 2,000 permanently disabled, 7,100 captured) Italian mainland: (Note: Between 1 September 1943 and 10 May 1944: 87,579 casualties. Between 11 May 1944 and 31 January 1945: 194,330 casualties. Between February and March 1945: 13,741 casualties. British estimates for 1–22 April 1945: 41,000 casualties. This total excludes Axis forces that surrendered at the end of the campaign) (Note: Ellis states that from various sources, between September 1939 and 31 December 1944, the German Armed Forces (including the Waffen SS and foreign volunteers) lost 59,940 killed, 163,600 wounded, and 357,090 captured within Italy.) (Note: Overmans lists the total death toll of German troops in Italy (including Sicily) as 150,660. The US military estimated 91,000 German and Italian dead in the Italian campaign, thereof 5,000 in Sicily and 86,000 on the Italian mainland, and 364,189 captured prior to the surrender of Army Group C, thereof 7,100 in Sicily and 357,086 on the Italian mainland Including 10 killed, 15 wounded and 800 defected from the Protectorate of Bohemia and Moravia) (Nazi Germany) 336,650–580,630 (Italian Social Republic) 35,000 (dead only); Surrender at Caserta: 1,000,000 captured (Note: "The surrender of nearly one million men from Army Group C, effective at noon on May 2, brought to an end the Mediterranean struggle that had begun five years earlier."); Total: 1,549,590–1,793,570 casualties Aircraft: (Nazi Germany) ~4,500 aircraft lost
- 152,940 civilians killed

The Italian campaign of World War II, also called the Liberation of Italy following the German occupation in September 1943, consisted of Allied and Axis operations in and around Italy, from 1943 to 1945. The joint Allied Forces Headquarters (AFHQ) was operationally responsible for all Allied land forces in the Mediterranean theatre and it planned and led the invasion of Sicily in July 1943, followed in September by the invasion of the Italian mainland and the campaign in Italy until the surrender of the Axis forces in Italy in May 1945.

The invasion of Sicily in July 1943 led to the collapse of the Fascist Italian regime and the fall of Mussolini, who was deposed and arrested by order of King Victor Emmanuel III on 25 July. The new government signed an armistice with the Allies on 8 September 1943. However, German forces soon invaded northern and central Italy, committing several atrocities against Italian civilians and army units who opposed the German occupation and started the Italian resistance movement. Mussolini, who was rescued by German paratroopers, established a collaborationist puppet state, the Italian Social Republic (RSI), to administer the German-occupied territory. On 13 October 1943, the Allies recognized Italy as a co-belligerent in the war against Germany. Thereafter, the Italian Co-Belligerent Army and the Italian partisans fought alongside the Allies against German troops and the collaborationist National Republican Army; an aspect of this period is the Italian civil war. In the summer of 1944, after the Axis defeats at Cassino and Anzio, central Italy, including Rome, was liberated. Northern Italy was liberated following the final spring offensive and the general insurrection of Italian partisans on 25 April 1945. Mussolini was captured by the Italian resistance and summarily executed by firing squad. The campaign ended when Army Group C surrendered unconditionally to the Allies on 2 May 1945, one week before the formal German Instrument of Surrender. Both sides committed war crimes during the conflict, and the independent states of San Marino and Vatican City surrounded by Italian territory also suffered damage.

It is estimated that between September 1943 and April 1945, 60,000–70,000 Allied and 38,805–150,660 German soldiers died in Italy. (Note: In Alexander's Generals Blaxland quotes 59,151 Allied deaths between 3 September 1943 and 2 May 1945 as recorded at AFHQ and gives the breakdown between 20 nationalities: United States 20,442; United Kingdom, 18,737; France, Morocco, Algeria, Tunisia, Senegal and Belgium 5,241; Canada, 4,798; India, Pakistan, Nepal 4,078; Poland 2,028; New Zealand 1,688; Italy (excluding irregulars) 917; South Africa 800; Brazil 275; Greece 115; Jewish volunteers from the British Mandate in Palestine 32. In addition 35 soldiers were killed by enemy action while serving with pioneer units from Botswana, Lesotho, Swaziland, Seychelles, Mauritius, Sri Lanka, Lebanon, Cyprus and the West Indies) The number of Allied casualties was about 330,000 and the German figure (excluding those involved in the final surrender) was over 330,000. (Note: Field Marshal Sir Harold Alexander after the war used a figure of 312,000 but later historians generally arrive at a slightly higher figure.) Fascist Italy, prior to its collapse, suffered about 200,000 casualties, mostly prisoners-of-war taken in the invasion of Sicily, including more than 40,000 killed or missing. Over 150,000 Italian civilians died, as did 35,828 anti-Nazi and anti-fascist partisans and some 35,000 troops of the Italian Social Republic. (Note: In 2010, the Ufficio dell'Albo d'Oro recorded 13,021 RSI soldiers killed; however, the Ufficio dell'Albo d'Oro excludes from its lists of the fallen the individuals who committed war crimes. In the context of the RSI, where numerous war crimes were committed during the Nazi security warfare, and many individuals were therefore involved in such crimes (especially GNR and Black Brigades personnel), this influences negatively the casualty count, under a statistical point of view. The "RSI Historical Foundation" (Fondazione RSI Istituto Storico) has drafted a list that lists the names of some 35,000 RSI military personnel killed in action or executed during and immediately after World War II (including the "revenge killings" that occurred at the end of the hostilities and in their immediate aftermath), including some 13,500 members of the Guardia Nazionale Repubblicana and Milizia Difesa Territoriale, 6,200 members of the Black Brigades, 2,800 Aeronautica Nazionale Repubblicana personnel, 1,000 Marina Nazionale Repubblicana personnel, 1,900 X MAS personnel, 800 soldiers of the "Monterosa" Division, 470 soldiers of the "Italia" Division, 1,500 soldiers of the "San Marco" Division, 300 soldiers of the "Littorio" Division, 350 soldiers of the "Tagliamento" Alpini Regiment, 730 soldiers of the 3rd and 8th Bersaglieri regiments, 4,000 troops of miscellaneous units of the Esercito Nazionale Repubblicano (excluding the above-mentioned Divisions and Alpini and Bersaglieri Regiments), 300 members of the Legione Autonoma Mobile "Ettore Muti", 200 members of the Raggruppamento Anti Partigiani, 550 members of the Italian SS, and 170 members of the Cacciatori degli Appennini Regiment.) On the Western Front of World War II, Italy was the most costly campaign in terms of casualties suffered by infantry forces of both sides, during bitter small-scale fighting around strongpoints at the Winter Line, the Anzio beachhead and the Gothic Line. Casualties among infantry in Italy were proportionally higher than they were on the Western Front of WWI.

== Strategic background ==
The British, especially the Prime Minister, Winston Churchill, advocated their traditional naval-based peripheral strategy. Even with a large army, but greater naval power, the traditional British answer against a continental enemy was to fight as part of a coalition, blockading with their navy and mounting small peripheral operations designed to gradually weaken the enemy. The United States, with the larger U.S. Army, favoured a more direct attack against the main German Army in northwestern Europe. The ability to launch such a campaign depended on first securing the North Atlantic convoy route to allow the build-up of forces in Britain.

The strategic disagreement was fierce as the U.S. service chiefs argued for an invasion of France as early as possible, while their British counterparts advocated attacks around the Mediterranean. There was even pressure from some Latin American countries to stage an invasion of Spain, which, under Francisco Franco, was friendly to the Axis nations, although not a participant in the war. The American staff believed that a full-scale invasion of France was required to end the war in Europe, which should be undertaken as early with no other operations that might delay it.

Eventually the U.S. and British political leadership reached a compromise in which both would commit most of their forces to an invasion of France in early 1944, but also launch a relatively small-scale Italian campaign. A contributing factor was Franklin D. Roosevelt's desire to keep U.S. troops active in the European theatre during 1943 and his attraction to the idea of eliminating Italy from the war, or at least weakening and narrowing its effort. The elimination of Italy would enable Allied naval forces, principally the Royal Navy, to dominate the Mediterranean Sea, securing the lines of communications with Egypt and thus Asia. Italian divisions on occupation and coastal defence duties in the Balkans and France would be withdrawn to defend Italy, while the Germans would have to transfer troops from the Eastern Front to defend Italy and the entire southern coast of France, relieving pressure on the Soviet Union.

== Campaign ==
=== Invasion of Sicily ===
Allied operations in Sicily, 10 July–17 August 1943, showing the advances of American, British and Canadian forces during Operation Husky.

The initial plan was for landings in the south-east, south and north-west areas of Sicily which would lead to the rapid capture of key Axis airfields and all main ports on the island except Messina. This would allow a rapid Allied build-up, as well as denying the ports to the Axis. This was later altered to a reduced number of landings with more concentration of force.

The invasion (Operation Husky) began on 9 July 1943 with amphibious and airborne landings at the Gulf of Gela. Land forces involved were the U.S. Seventh Army, under Lieutenant General George Patton, the 1st Canadian Infantry Division and the 1st Canadian Armoured Brigade under Major-General Guy Simonds, and the British Eighth Army under General Bernard Montgomery.

The original plan required a strong advance by the British northwards along the east coast to Messina. The Canadians took the central position, with the British on their right and the Americans on the left. The Canadian War Cemetery in Agira is testament to the sacrifice made driving the Germans from the rugged terrain. The Americans had the important role of pushing Axis forces out of mainland Sicily on left flank. When the British Eighth Army were held up by stubborn defences in the rugged hills south of Mount Etna, Patton's Seventh Army pushed northwest toward Palermo then directly north to cut the northern coastal road. This was followed by an eastward advance north of Etna towards Messina, supported by a series of amphibious landings on the northern coast that propelled Patton's troops into Messina shortly before the first British units. The retreating German and Italian forces managed to evacuate most of their troops to the mainland, with the last leaving on 17 August 1943. Shortly thereafter, American Colonel Fairfax Kirkwood Dillon received the surrender of the island.

The seaborne invasion, the first of its kind in the European theater, provided Allied forces with crucial experience in contested amphibious landing operations, coalition warfare, and large airborne drops.

=== Invasion of mainland Italy ===
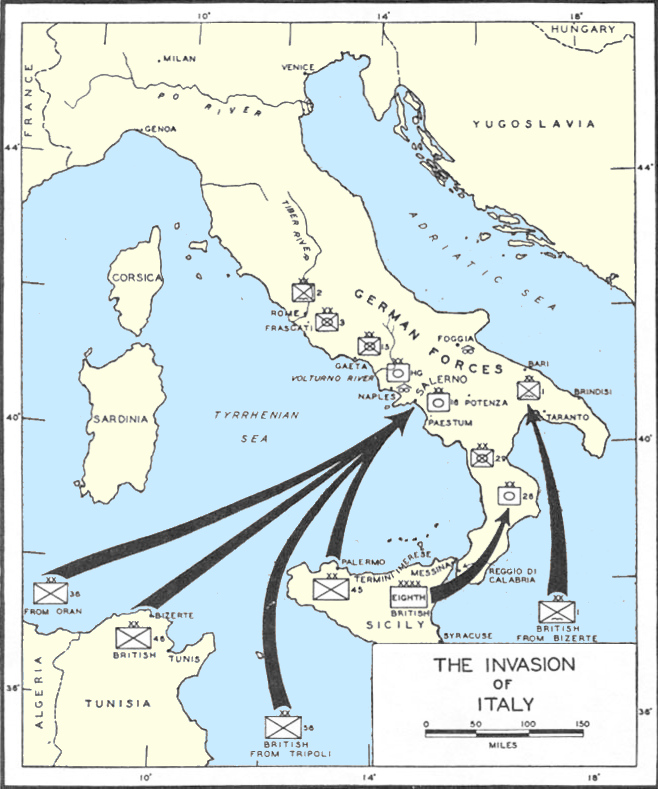
Allied landings and operations during the invasion of mainland Italy in September 1943.

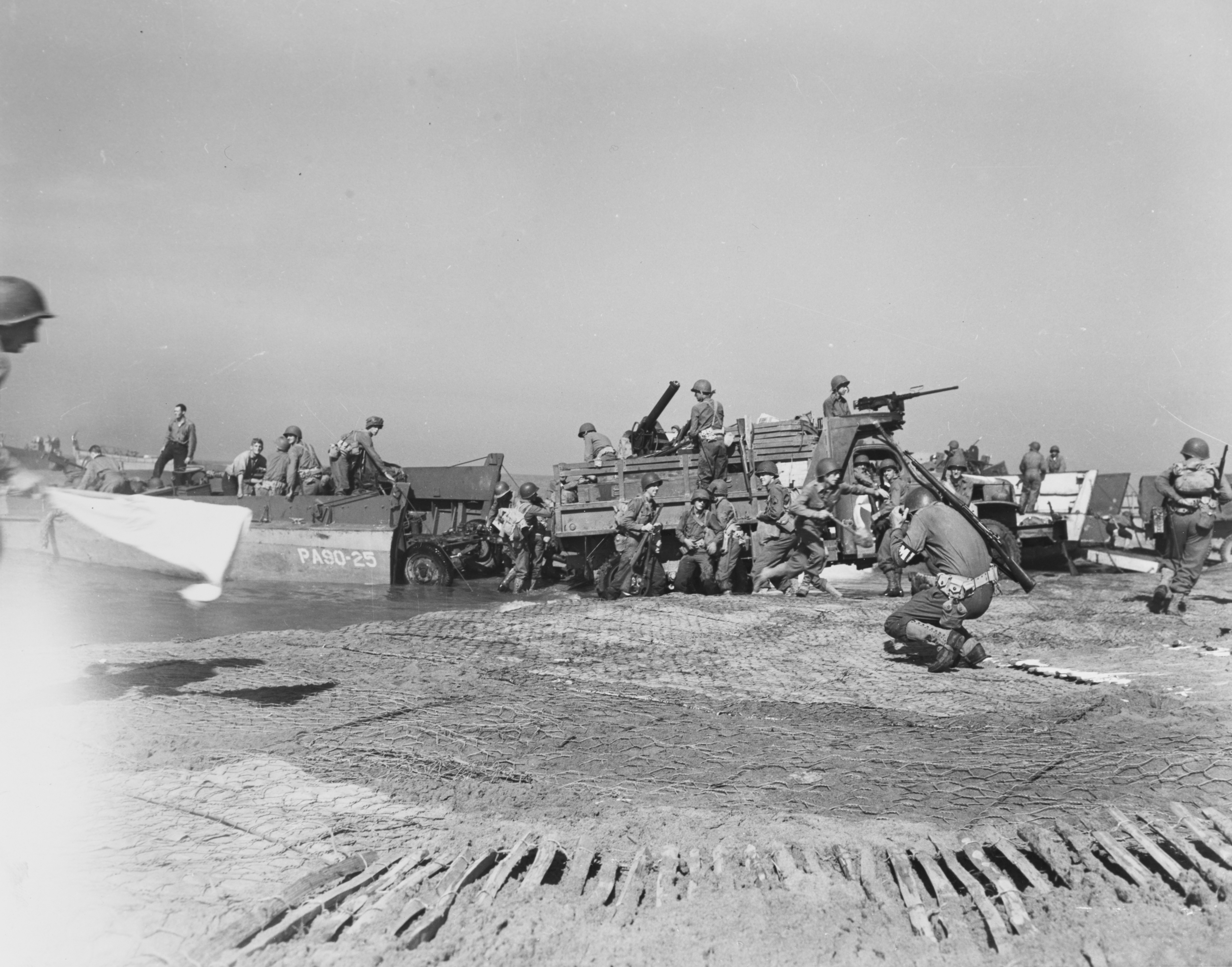
Artillery being landed during the invasion of mainland Italy at Salerno, September 1943

Forces of the British Eighth Army, still under Montgomery, landed in the toe of Italy on 3 September 1943 in Operation Baytown, the day the Italian government agreed to an armistice with the Allies. The armistice was publicly announced on 8 September broadcasts by General Eisenhower and then by Marshal Badoglio. Although the German forces prepared to defend without Italian assistance, only two of their divisions opposite the Eighth Army and one at Salerno were available, with the rest tied up in disarming the Italian army.

On 9 September, forces of the U.S. Fifth Army, under Lieutenant General Mark W. Clark, expecting little resistance, landed against heavy German resistance at Salerno in Operation Avalanche; despite lacking reinforcement from the north, the German 10th Army came close to repelling the landing. In addition, British forces landed almost unopposed at Taranto in Operation Slapstick.

Adolf Hitler was then persuaded that Southern Italy was strategically unimportant, and the Allies, with the new addition of Italy, hoped the Germans would withdraw north. For a while, the Eighth Army advanced easily up the eastern coast, capturing the port of Bari and the important airfields around Foggia. The main Allied effort in the west initially centred on the port of Naples, the northernmost range of fighter planes flying from Sicily. Anti-Fascist Forces began an uprising, the Four days of Naples, holding out despite German reprisals until the arrival of Allied forces.

As the Allies advanced, they encountered increasingly difficult terrain: the Apennine Mountains form a spine along the Italian peninsula offset somewhat to the east. In the most mountainous areas of Abruzzo, more than half the width of the peninsula comprises crests and peaks over 900 metres (3,000 feet) that are relatively easy to defend; and the spurs and re-entrants to the spine confronted the Allies with a succession of ridges and rivers across their line of advance. The rivers were subject to unpredictable flooding which impeded operations.

=== Allied advance on Rome ===
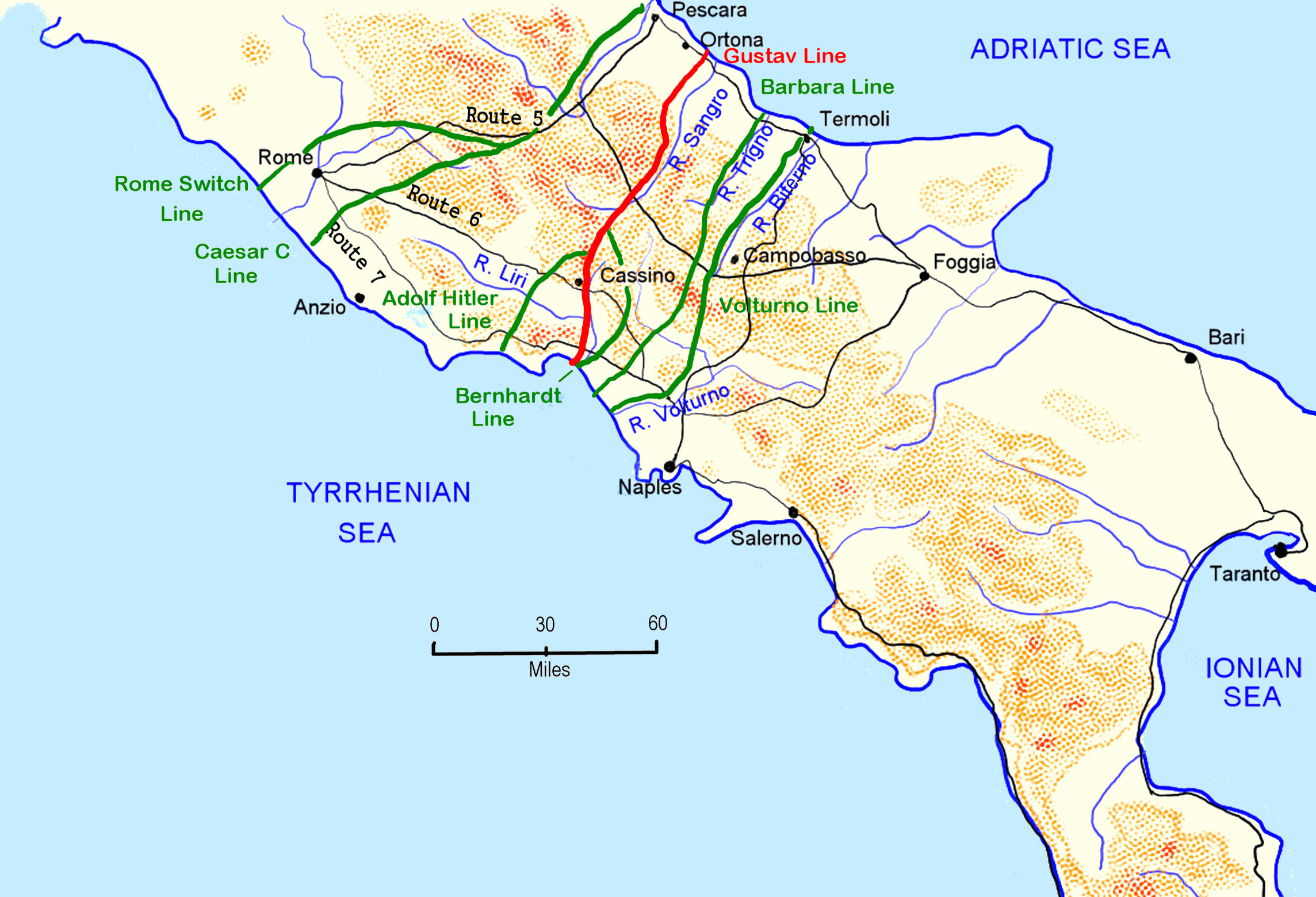
The situation south of Rome showing German prepared defensive lines

In early October 1943, Hitler was persuaded by his Army Group Commander in Southern Italy, Field Marshal Albert Kesselring, that the defence of Italy should be conducted as far away from Germany as possible. This would make the most of the natural defensive geography of Central Italy, whilst denying the Allies the easy capture of a succession of airfields ever closer to Germany. Hitler was also convinced that yielding southern Italy would provide the Allies with a springboard for an invasion of the Balkans, with its vital resources of oil, bauxite, and copper.

Kesselring was given command of the whole of Italy and immediately ordered the preparation of a series of defensive lines across the peninsula, south of Rome. The defensive Volturno and Barbara Lines were used to delay the Allied advance during the preparation of the more formidable Winter Line – the collective name for the Gustav Line and, west of the Apennine Mountains, the Bernhardt Line and Hitler Lines (renamed Senger Line by 23 May 1944).

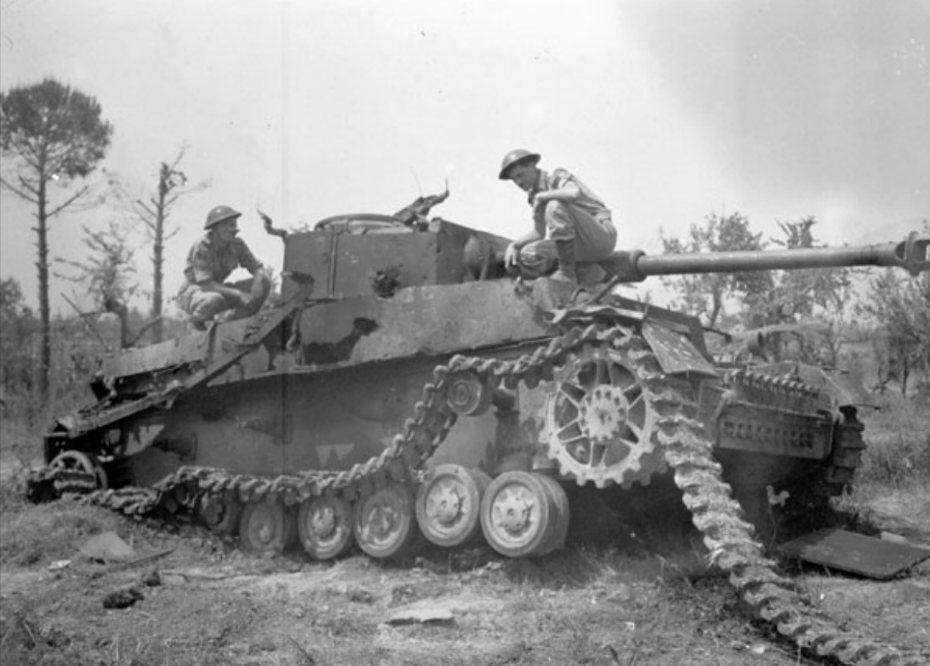
Troops of the 5th Canadian Armoured Division examining a knocked out German Panzer IV tank on the road to Rome, 26 May 1944

At the end of 1943, the Winter Line halted the Allied Fifth Army's advance on the western side of Italy. Although the Gustav Line was penetrated on the Eighth Army's Adriatic front, and Ortona was liberated with heavy casualties by Canadian troops, the blizzards, drifting snow and zero visibility at the end of December ground the advance to a halt. The Allies' focus then turned to the west, where an attack through the Liri valley was considered to have the best chance of a breakthrough towards Rome. Landings behind the line at Anzio during Operation Shingle, advocated by Churchill, were intended to destabilise the German Gustav line defences, but the early thrust inland to cut off the German defences did not occur because of disagreements with the American commander, Major General John P. Lucas, who insisted that his forces were not too few for the mission. Lucas entrenched his forces, allowing Kesselring to assemble sufficient forces to form a ring around the beachhead. After a month of hard fighting against German and RSI forces, Lucas was replaced by Major General Lucian Truscott, who eventually broke out in May.

It took four major offensives between January and May 1944 before the line was eventually broken by a combined assault of the Fifth and Eighth Armies (including British, American, French, Polish, and Canadian corps) concentrated along a 30-kilometre (20-mile) front between Monte Cassino and the western seaboard.

In a concurrent action, Clark was ordered to break out of the stagnant position at Anzio and seize a large part of the German 10th Army retreating from the Gustav Line between them and the Canadians. But this opportunity was wasted when Clark disobeyed his orders and sent his U.S. forces to enter the undefended Rome instead. Rome had been declared an open city by the German Army so no resistance was encountered. The American forces took possession of Rome on 4 June 1944. The German 10th Army was allowed to get away and, in the next few weeks, may have been responsible for doubling Allied casualties in the next few months.

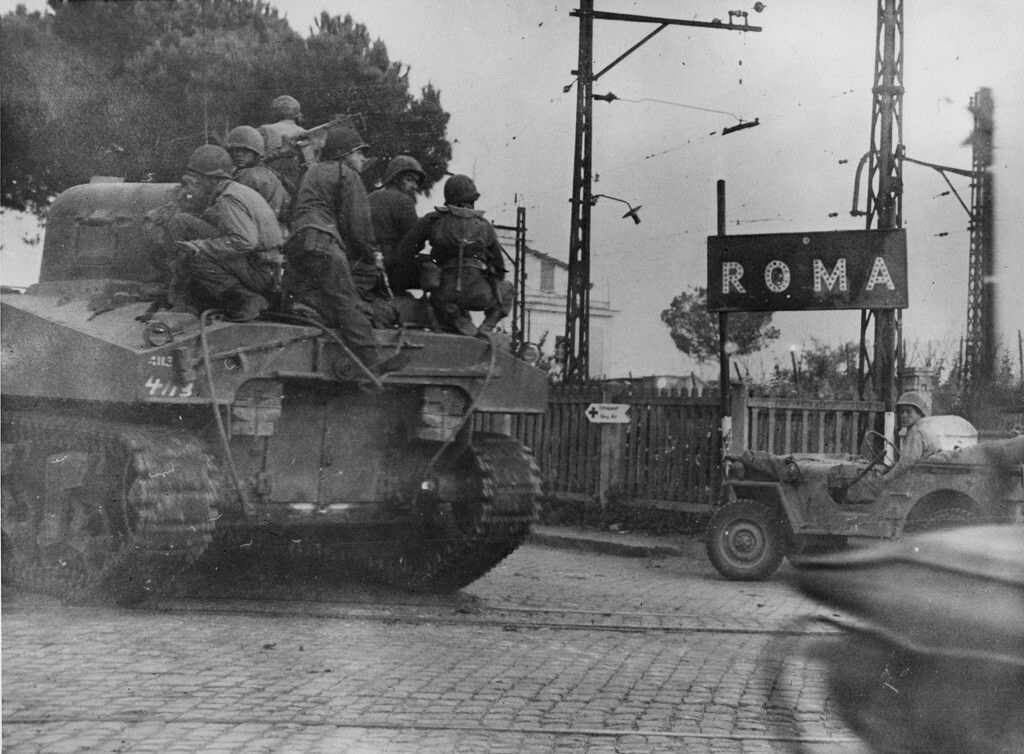
US 13th Armored Regiment enters Rome, 4 June 1944

=== Allied advance into Northern Italy ===
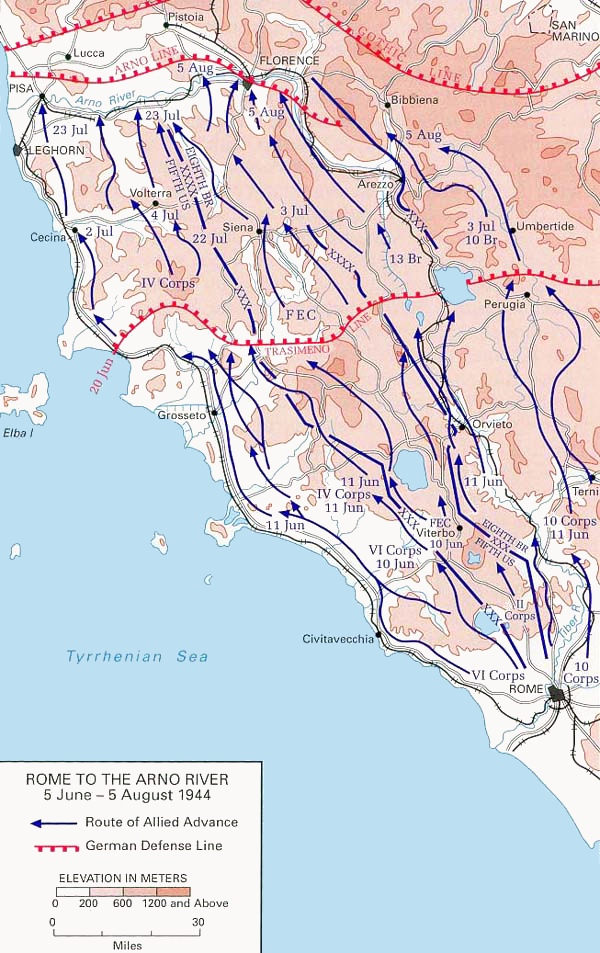
Allied advance from Rome toward the Arno River, June–August 1944.

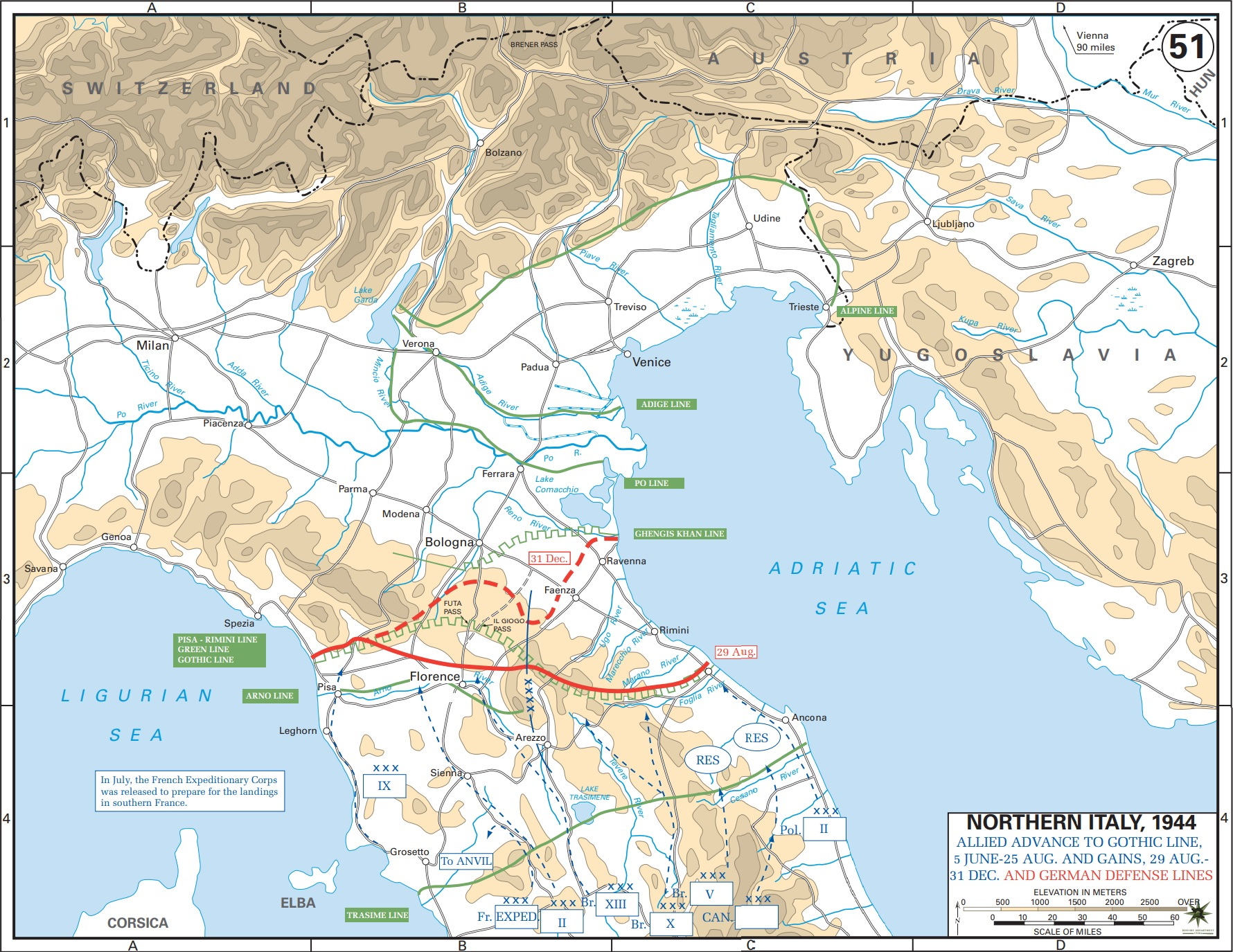
The Gothic Line and Allied advances in northern Italy during the second half of 1944.

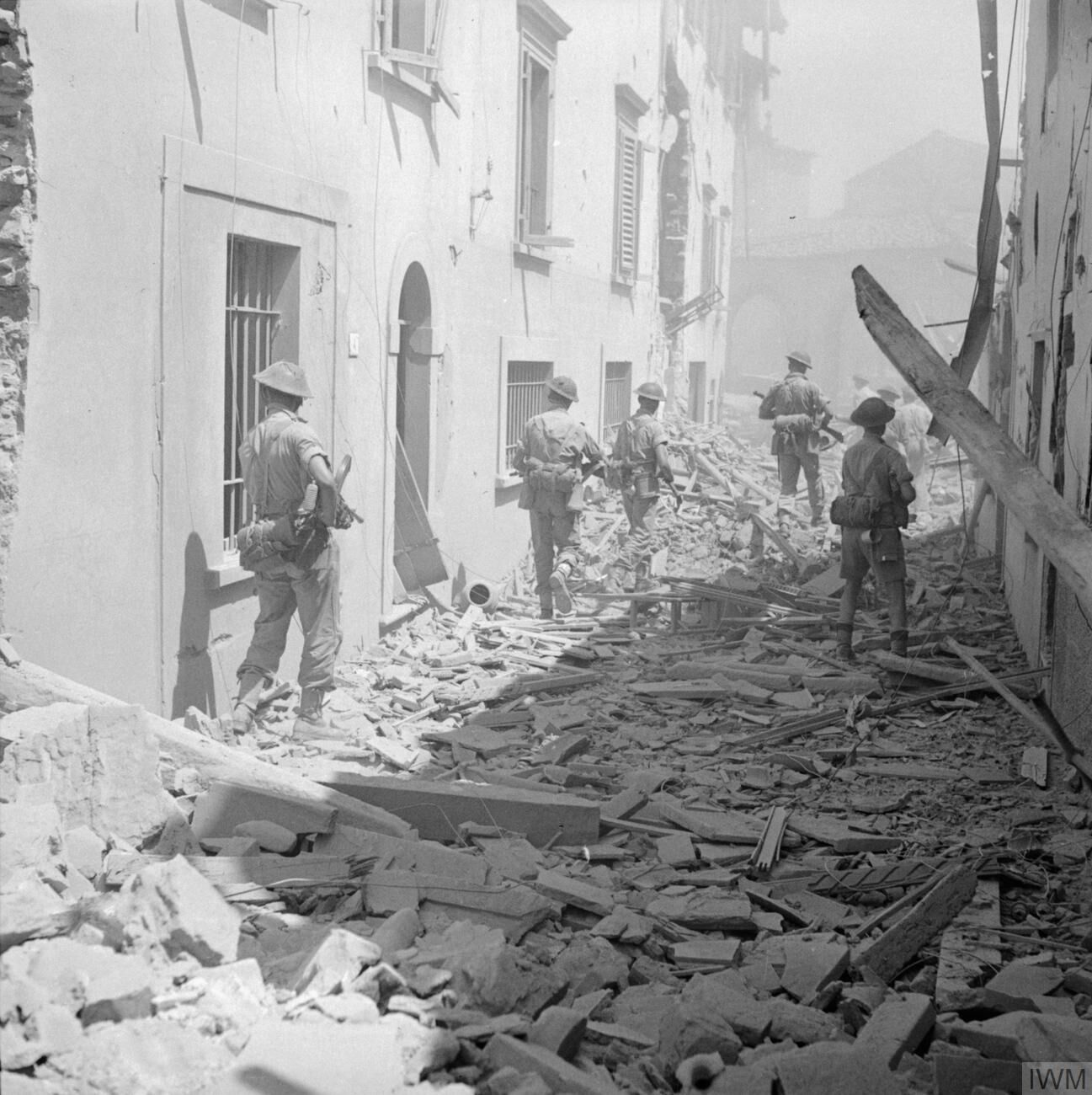
British infantry moving cautiously through the ruined streets of Impruneta, 3 August 1944

After the capture of Rome, and the Allied invasion of Normandy in June, the U.S. VI Corps and the French Expeditionary Corps (FEC), which together amounted to seven divisions, were pulled out of Italy in summer 1944 to participate in Operation Dragoon, the Allied invasion of Southern France. The sudden removal of these experienced units from the Italian front was only partially compensated by the gradual arrival of three divisions, the Brazilian 1st Infantry Division, the U.S. 92nd Infantry Division, both in the second half of 1944, and the U.S. 10th Mountain Division in January 1945.

From June to August 1944, the Allies advanced beyond Rome, taking Florence and closing on the Gothic Line. This last major defensive line ran from the coast some 50 kilometres (30 miles) north of Pisa, along the jagged Apennine Mountains between Florence and Bologna to the Adriatic coast, just south of Rimini. In order to shorten the Allied lines of communication for the advance into Northern Italy, the Polish II Corps advanced towards the port of Ancona and, after a month-long battle, succeeded in capturing it on 18 July.

During Operation Olive, launched 25 August, the Gothic Line defences were penetrated on both the Fifth and Eighth Army fronts, but without a decisive breakthrough. Churchill had hoped that a major advance in late 1944 would open the way for the Allied armies to advance northeast through the "Ljubljana Gap" between Venice and Vienna to Vienna and Hungary, forestalling the Red Army's advance into Eastern Europe. Churchill's proposal had been strongly opposed by the U.S. Chiefs of Staff, despite its importance to British postwar interests in the region, as they did not believe that it aligned with overall Allied war priorities.

In October, Lieutenant General Sir Richard McCreery succeeded Lieutenant General Sir Oliver Leese as the commander of the Eighth Army. In December, Lieutenant General Mark Clark, the Fifth Army commander, was appointed to command the 15th Army Group, thereby succeeding the British General Sir Harold Alexander as commander of all Allied ground troops in Italy; Alexander succeeded Field Marshal Sir Henry Wilson as the Supreme Allied Commander in the Mediterranean Theatre. Clark was succeeded in command of the Fifth Army by now-Lieutenant General Truscott. Winter and spring 1944–45 saw extensive partisan activity in Northern Italy, taking the character of a civil war between the two opposed Italian governments.

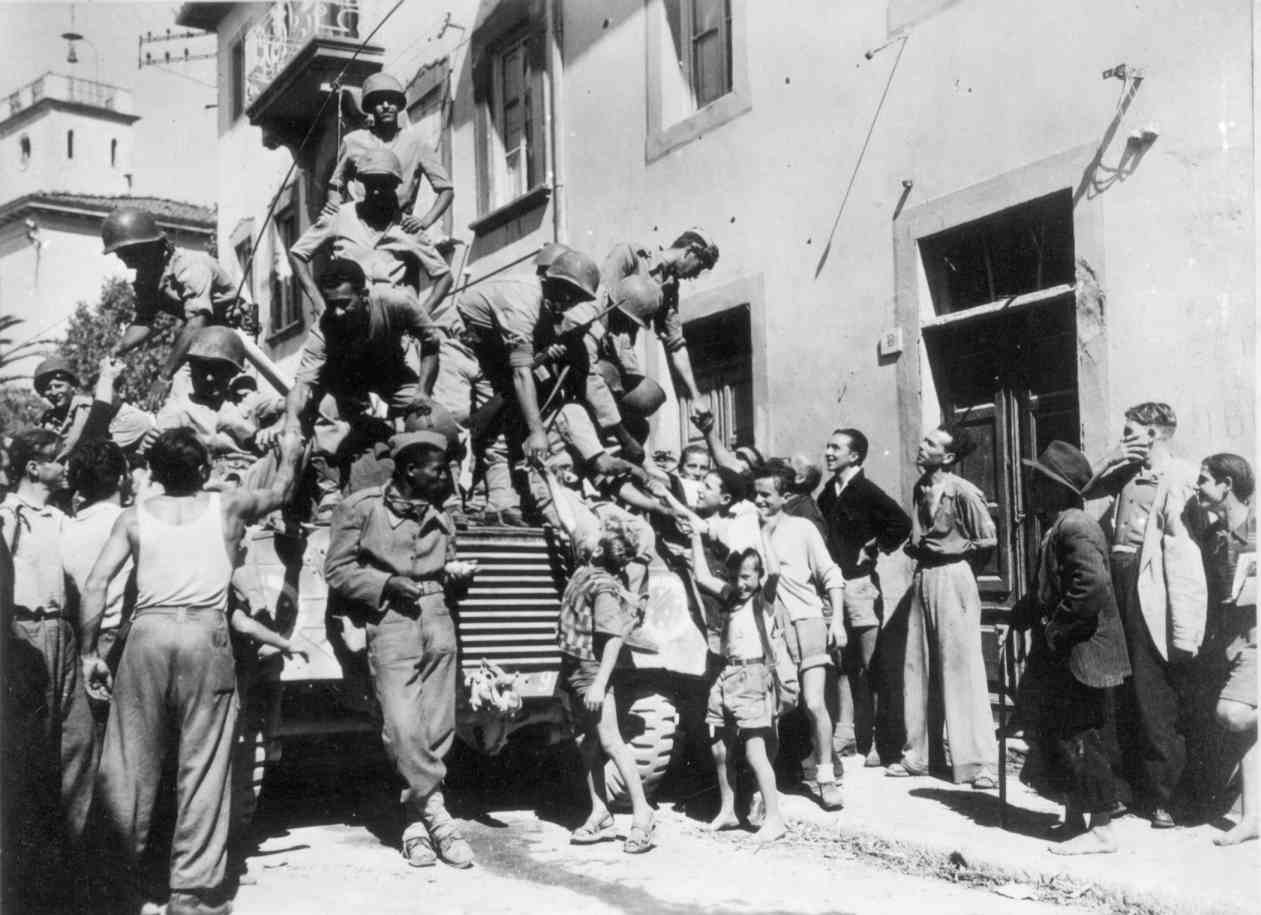
Brazilian troops arrive in the city of Massarosa, Italy, September 1944.

The Allied offensive was halted in early 1945 due to poor winter weather which impeded armoured manoeuvre and air cover, coupled with the massive Allied losses during the autumn fighting, the need to transfer some British troops to Greece as well the British 5th Infantry Division and I Canadian Corps to northwestern Europe. The Allies adopted a strategy of "offensive defence" while preparing for a final attack when better weather and ground conditions arrived in spring.

In late February to early March 1945, Operation Encore saw elements of the U.S. IV Corps (1st Brazilian Division and the newly arrived U.S. 10th Mountain Division) battling forward across minefields in the Apennines to align their front with that of the U.S. II Corps on their right. They pushed the German defenders from the commanding heights of Monte Castello, Monte Belvedere, and Monte Castelnuovo, depriving them of artillery positions that had been commanding the approaches to Bologna since the narrowly failed Allied attempt to take the city in the autumn. Meanwhile, damage to other transport infrastructure forced Axis forces to use sea, canal and river routes for re-supply, leading to Operation Bowler against shipping in Venice harbour on 21 March 1945.

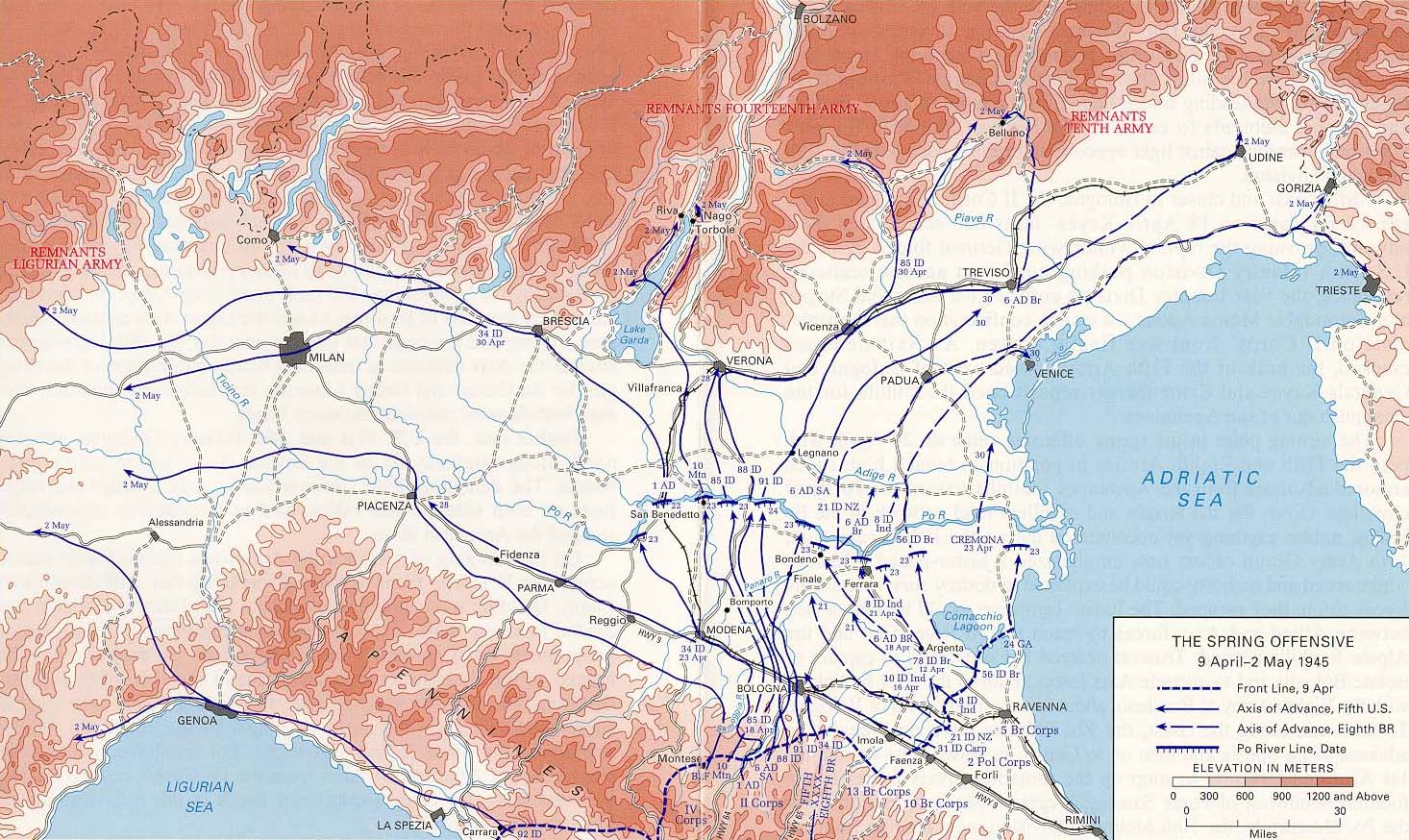
Allied spring offensive in northern Italy, April 1945, including the advance toward Bologna and the Po Valley.

The Allies' final offensive commenced with massive aerial and artillery bombardments on 9 April 1945. The Allies had 1,500,000 troops deployed, against 599,404 troops (439,224 German, 160,180 Italian). By 18 April, Eighth Army forces in the east had broken through the Argenta Gap and sent armour racing forward in an encircling move to meet the U.S. IV Corps advancing from the Apennines in Central Italy and to trap the remaining defenders of Bologna. On 21 April, Bologna was entered by the 3rd Carpathian Division, the Italian Friuli Group (both from the Eighth Army) and the U.S. 34th Infantry Division (from the Fifth Army). The U.S. 10th Mountain Division, which had bypassed Bologna, reached the River Po on 22 April; the 8th Indian Infantry Division, on the Eighth Army front, reached the river on 23 April.

By 25 April, the Italian Partisans' Committee of Liberation declared a general uprising, and on the same day, having crossed the Po on the right flank, forces of the Eighth Army advanced north-northeast towards Venice and Trieste. On the front of the U.S. Fifth Army, divisions drove north toward Austria and northwest to Milan. On the Fifth Army's left flank, the U.S. 92nd Infantry Division (Buffalo Soldiers) advanced along the coast to Genoa. A rapid march towards Turin by the Brazilian division on their right surprised and overwhelmed the Italo-German Army Liguria.

Between 26 April and 1 May there were the Battles of Collecchio-Fornovo di Taro, which resulted in the surrender of the 148th German Infantry Division to Brazilian soldiers of the FEB, who captured about 15,000 German and RSI soldiers. These battles marked the end of the conflicts in Italy and the end of the Italian fascist army.

As April 1945 came to an end, the German Army Group C, retreating on all fronts and having lost most of its fighting strength, was left with little option but surrender. General Heinrich von Vietinghoff, who had taken command of Army Group C after Albert Kesselring had been transferred to become Commander-in-Chief of the Western Front (OB West) in March 1945, signed the instrument of surrender of German forces in Italy on 29 April, formally ending hostilities on 3 May 1945, at 17:30 UTC. On 1 May, two days before this capitulation, Marshal Rodolfo Graziani, the Minister of Defense of the Italian Social Republic, which had sent a delegation to surrender the RSI units, ordered Army Group Liguria to surrender.

=== Progress of the campaign ===
Progress of the war in Italy and the other European fronts

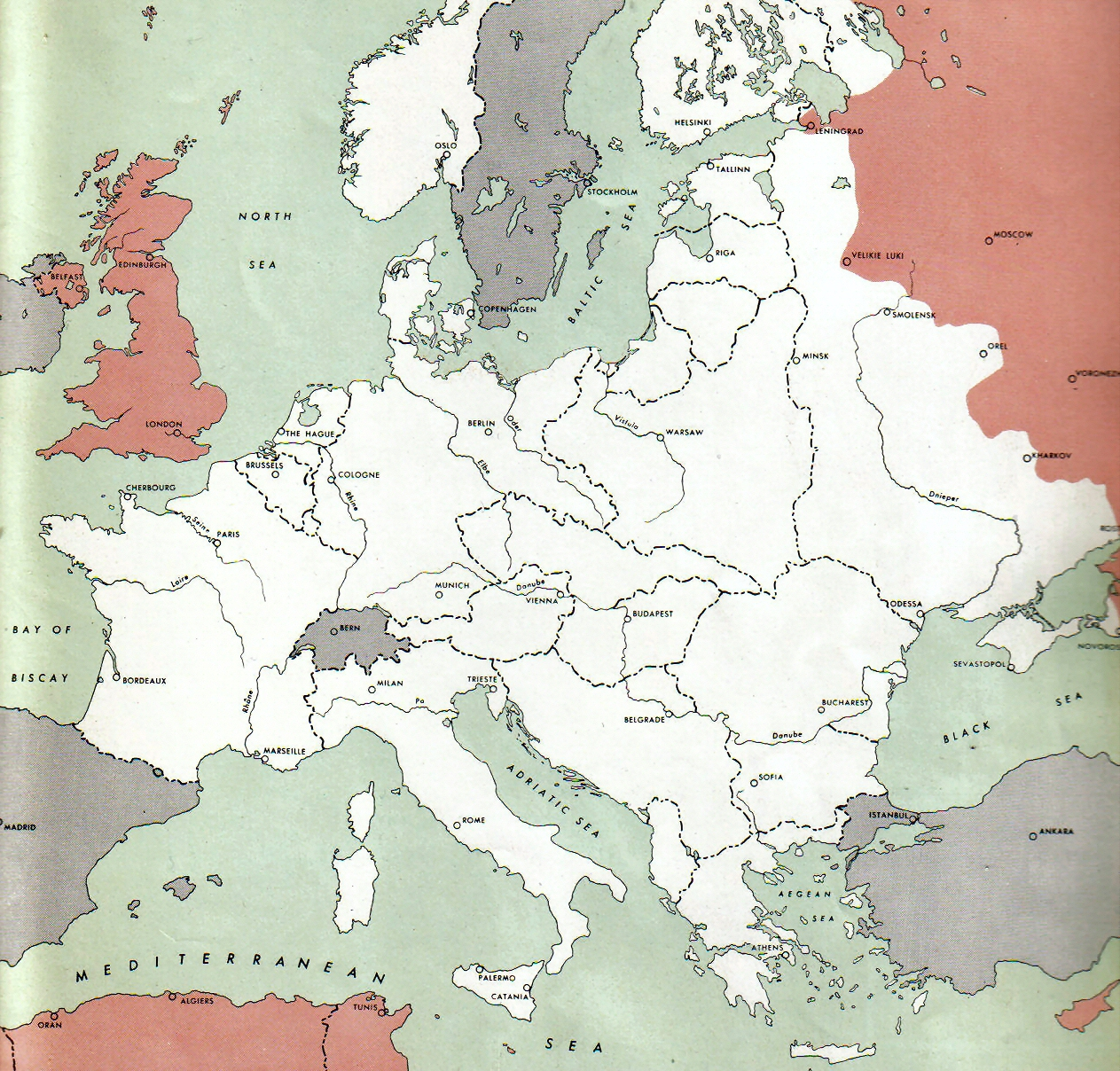
1 July 1943

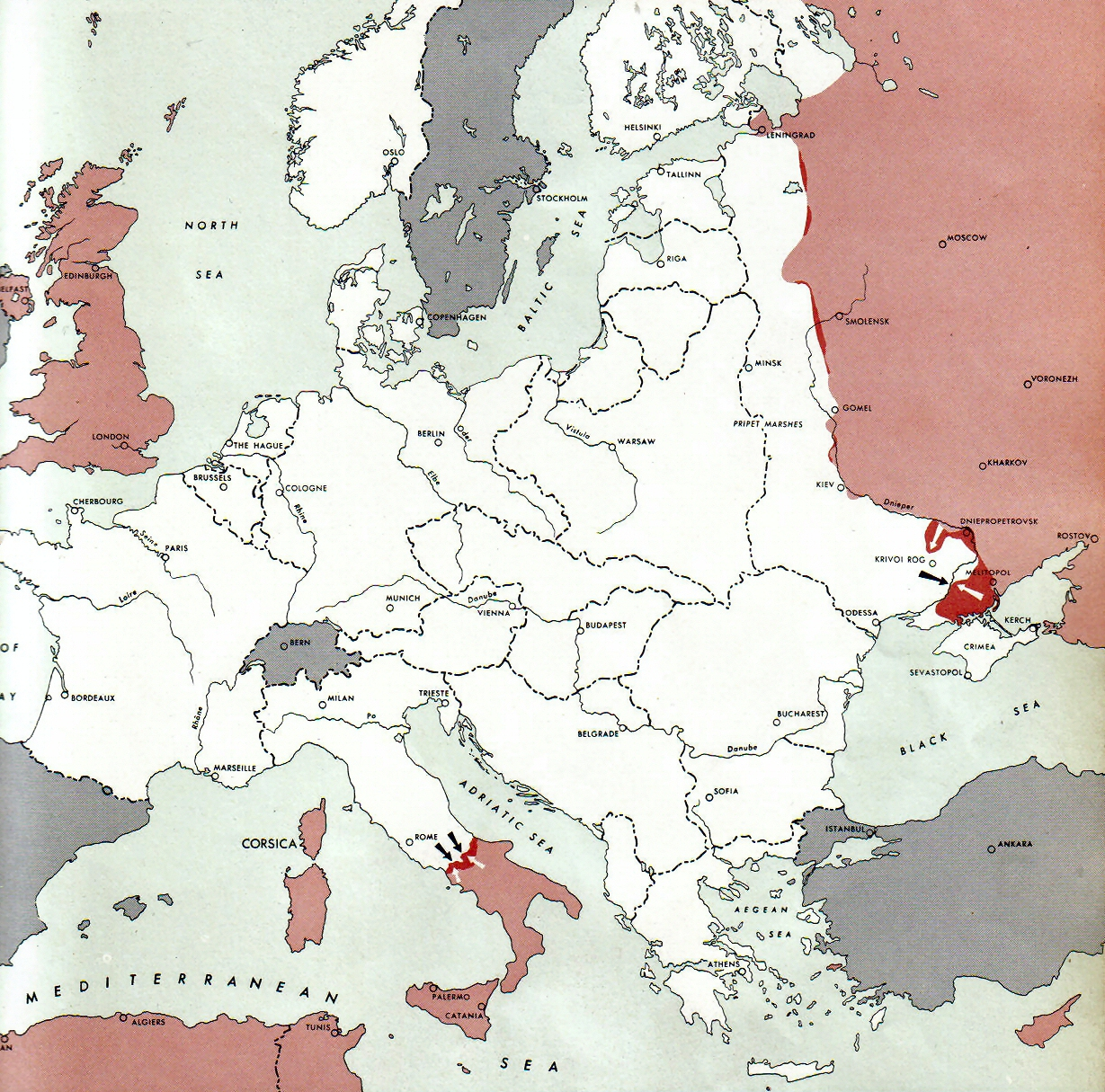
1 November 1943

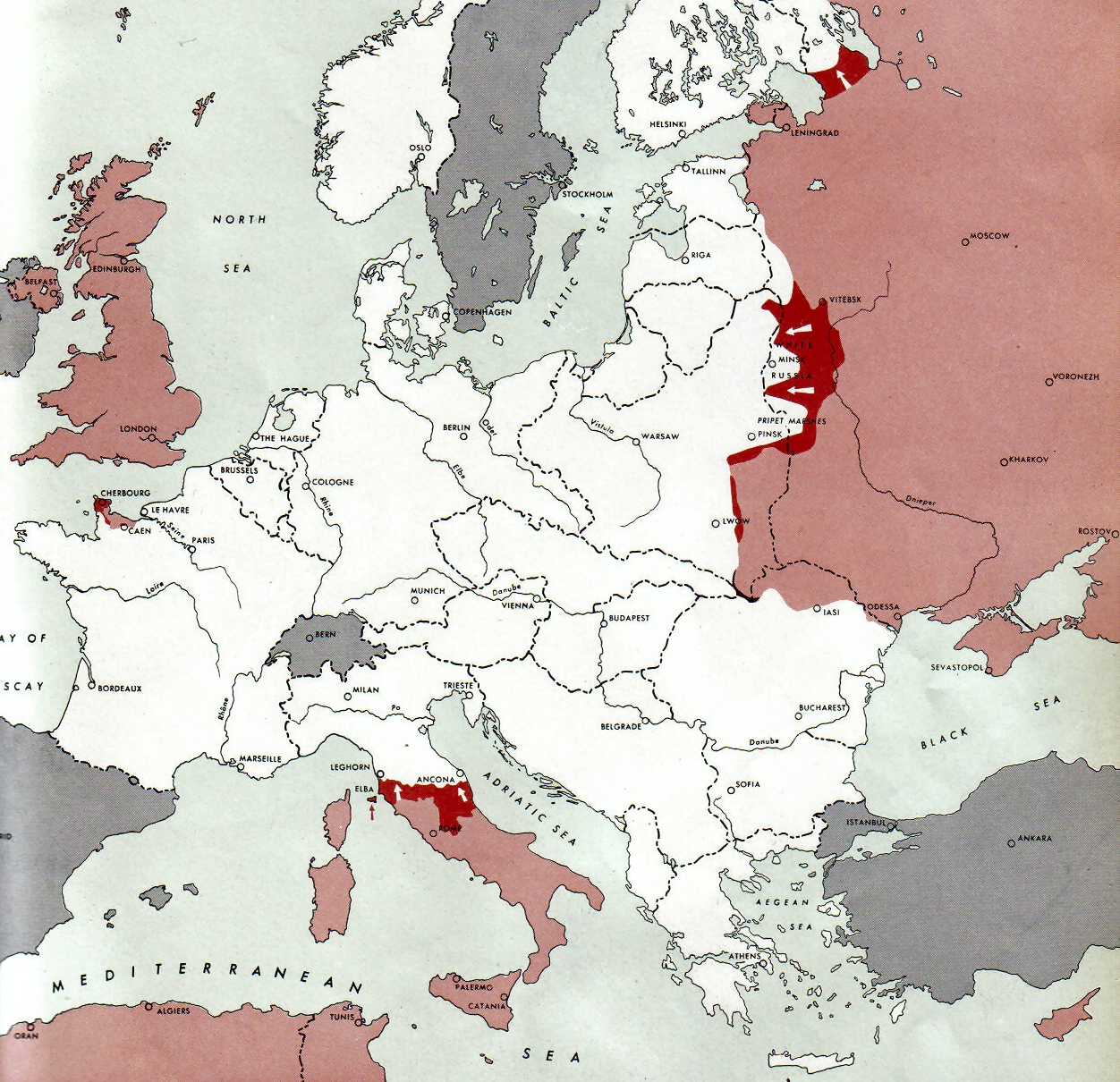
1 July 1944

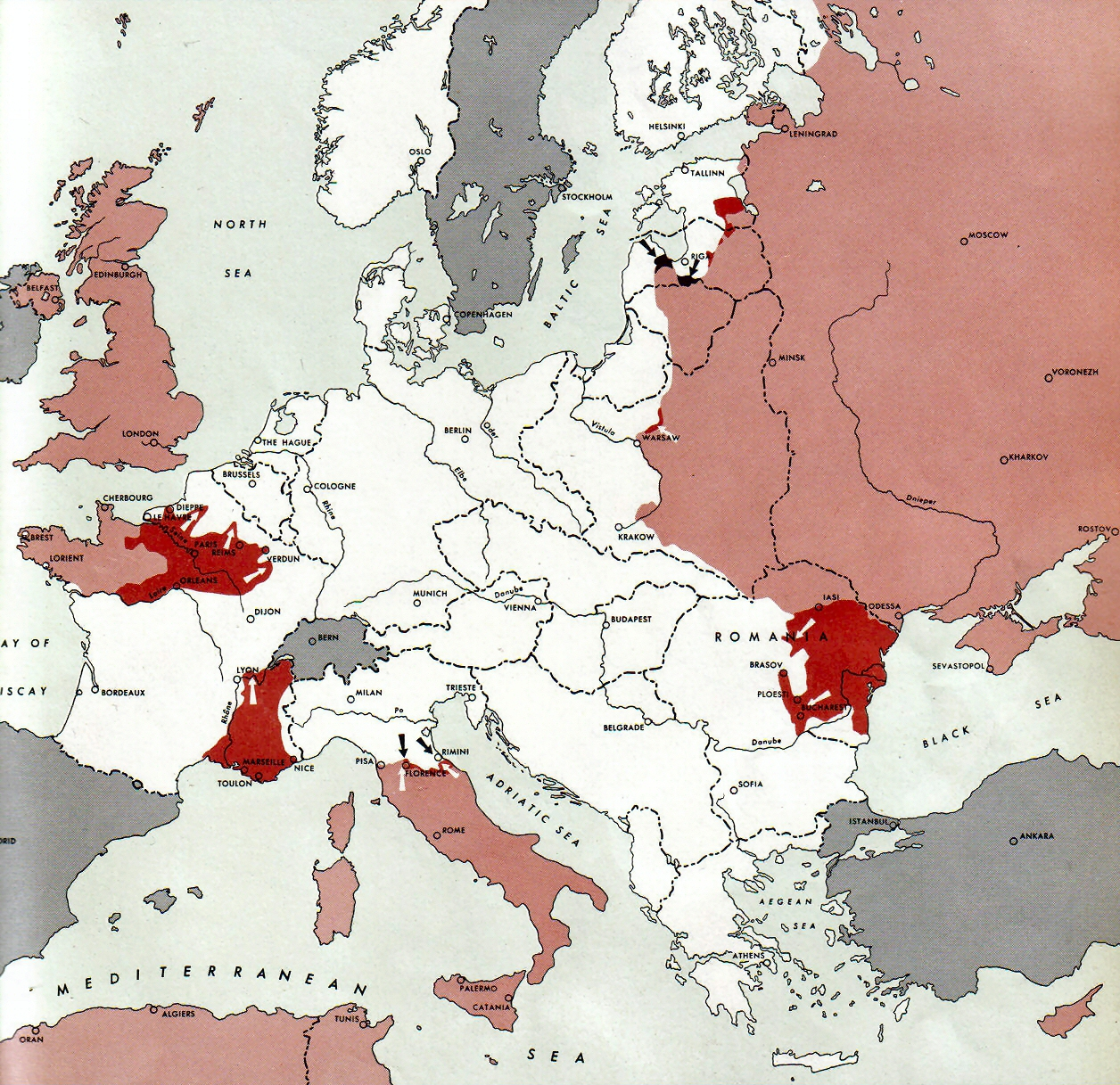
1 September 1944

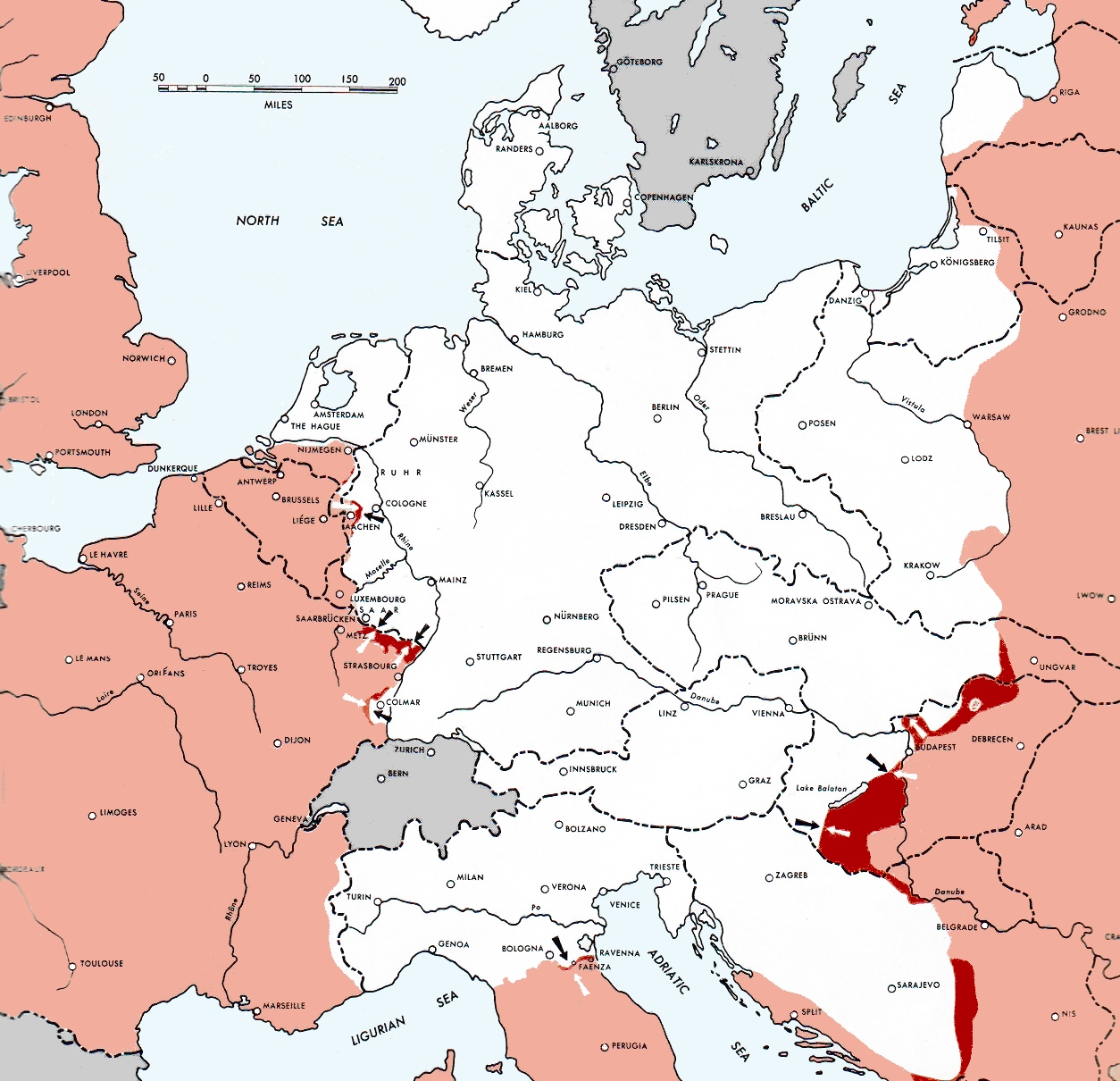
1 December 1944

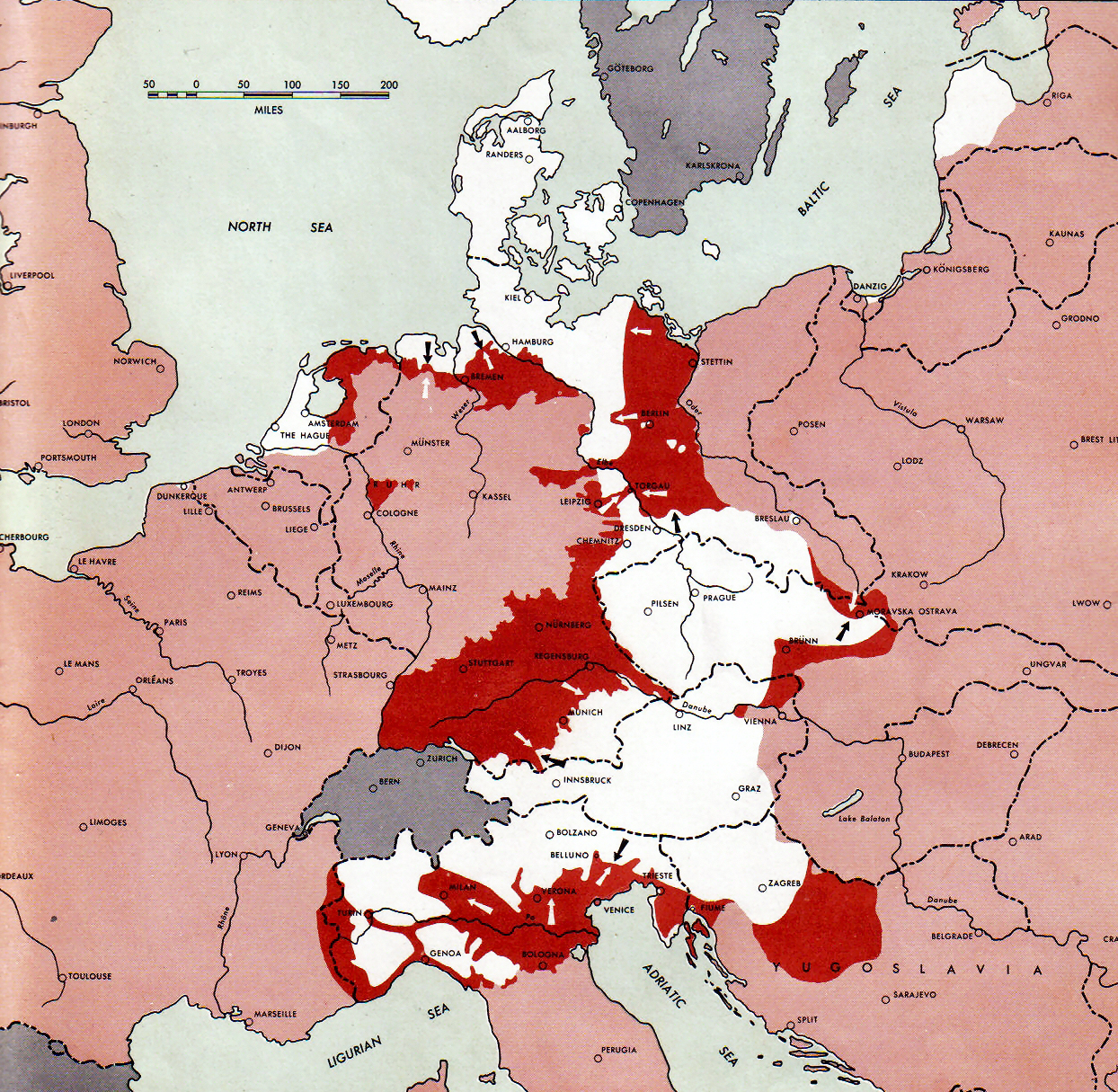
1 May 1945

== War crimes ==
=== Axis crimes ===
Research in 2016 funded by the German government found the number of victims of Nazi war crimes in Italy to be 22,000. The victims were primarily Italian civilians, sometimes in retaliation for partisan attacks, and Italian Jews.

Approximately 14,000 Italian non-Jewish civilians, often women, children and elderly, have been documented to have died in over 5,300 individual war crimes by Nazi Germany. The largest was the Marzabotto massacre, where over 770 civilians were murdered. The Sant'Anna di Stazzema massacre saw 560 civilians killed, while the Ardeatine massacre saw 335 randomly selected people executed, among them 75 Italian Jews. In the Padule di Fucecchio massacre up to 184 civilians were executed.

=== Allied crimes ===
Allied war crimes during the conflict were reported, including killing of civilians (such as the Canicattì massacre), execution of prisoners (such as two massacres at Biscari airfield on 14 July 1943), and rape (most notably the marocchinate).

== See also ==
- Italian front (World War I) – Italian theatre of World War I
- Liberation of France – End of Nazi occupation during World War II
- Military history of Italy during World War II
- Italian Co-Belligerent Army – Pro-allied Italian armed forces
- Italian Co-Belligerent Navy
- Italian Co-Belligerent Air Force – Air force of the Royalist government of Italy during the last years of World War II
- Italian Social Republic – Puppet state of Nazi Germany (1943–1945)
- Italian resistance movement – Italian combatant organizations opposed to Nazi-Fascism
- Italian Civil War – Conflict between the Mussolini regime and anti-fascists (1943–1945)
- List of British military equipment of World War II
- List of equipment of the United States Army during World War II
- List of German military equipment of World War II
