= 232nd Infantry Division (Wehrmacht) =

German military division

The 232nd Infantry Division (German: 232. Infanterie-Division) was an infantry division of the German Heer during World War II.

== Operational history ==
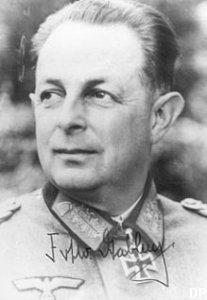
Eccard Freiherr von Gablenz

The 232nd Infantry Division was formed on 26 June 1944 in Wehrkreis IX as a division of the twenty-seventh Aufstellungswelle. It was formed at Wildflecken military exercise base from the Wildflecken Shadow Division, which had also been used to replenish the 715th Infantry Division early in the month of June 1944. The 232nd Infantry Division initially consisted of the Grenadier Regiments 1043, 1044 and 1045, as well as the Artillery Regiment 232. The division's only commander throughout its service was Eccard von Gablenz.

In August 1944, the division was deployed in the reserves of Armee-Abteilung Ligurien in the Italian theater. By February 1945, the division fought in the Apennine Mountains as part of LI Mountain Corps. At this point, Ernest Fisher notes the division was "originally intended only for rear area duty", and thus its troops comprised "either older men or convalescents intercepted en route to their former units on the Eastern front. In reserve were a fusilier battalion and elements of a mountain battalion."

The 232nd Infantry Division surrendered to Brazilian forces in the area between Brescia and Milan.

== Noteworthy individuals ==
- Eccard Freiherr von Gablenz, divisional commander of the 232nd Infantry Division.

== Literature ==
- v. Gablenz, Eccard Freiherr (1947). Einsatz der 232. Infanterie-Division in Italien.
- Heinrich Boucsein, Bomber, Jacos, Partisanen Potsdam: Kurt Vowinckel, 2000. ISBN 3934531040
