= Battle of Mont-Cenis =

Battle of Mont-Cenis (Operation Izard)
- Part of Second Battle of the Alps
Date	5–12 April 1945
Location	Mont-Cenis
Result	Axis defensive victory
Territorial changes	Italian forces re-capture Mont-Cenis, Pointe de Bellecombe and Mont-Froid

Belligerents
Italian Social Republic; Germany	France

Commanders and leaders
Edoardo Sala	Alain Le Ray

Units involved
1× Paratroopers battalion Gebirgsjäger	27th Alpine Brigade; 1st Free French Division

Strength
1,500 men	3,000 men

Casualties and losses
Unknown	61 killed

The Battle of Mont-Cenis (in Italian: Battaglia del Moncenisio), codenamed Operation Izard (in French: Opération Izard), was a battle fought over Mont-Cenis between Italian and French forces that started on 5 April 1945, as part of the Second Battle of the Alps.

== Battle ==
The attack on Mont-Cenis was carried out by the 3,000 men of the 7th Half-brigade of Chasseurs Alpins belonging to the 27th Alpine Brigade, led by Colonel Alain Le Ray, reinforced by two batteries of heavy artillery from the 1st Free French Division. The position was defended by a battalion of the 5th Gebirgsjäger Division and another battalion from the Paratroopers Regiment "Folgore" supported by German artillery: in total 1,500 men.

The operation opened with an attack on the German observation post at the Pointe de Bellecombe (2750m), which was reached after a 600m night climb in difficult weather. The post was destroyed, but a counter-attack forced the Chasseurs off the feature later the same day. The main objective for the French was the old fort at Mont-Froid which commanded the surrounding areas. After gaining a foothold in the fort on the 5 April, French forces finally captured it after several days of confused fighting at close quarters. However, an attack against the Fort de la Turra was a failure, and the offensive stalled when the heavy artillery units were withdrawn for the operation against the Authion massif. On the 12 April a perfectly executed counter-attack by the Gebirgsjäger and the troops of the "Folgore" recaptured the fort and evicted the French from the Mont-Cenis plateau. During the operation, the French lost 61 men.

== Aftermath ==
The failure of Operation Izard had severe consequences for Doyen's force as it persuaded the Americans to withhold further supplies for the offensive. The Mont-Cenis pass was captured only on the 27 April after Axis forces had retreated from the area.

== Sources ==
- Riccioli, Jean-Louis (1996). "La deuxième bataille des Alpes : printemps 1945". Cahiers de la Méditerranée (in French). 52 (1): 93–118. doi:10.3406/camed.1996.1161. ISSN 0395-9317.
- Ring, Jim (2014). Storming the Eagle's Nest: Hitler's War in the Alps. Faber & Faber. ISBN 978-0571282395.
