= Defense of the Redoute Ruinée (1945) =

Defense of Redoute Ruinée
- Part of Second Battle of the Alps
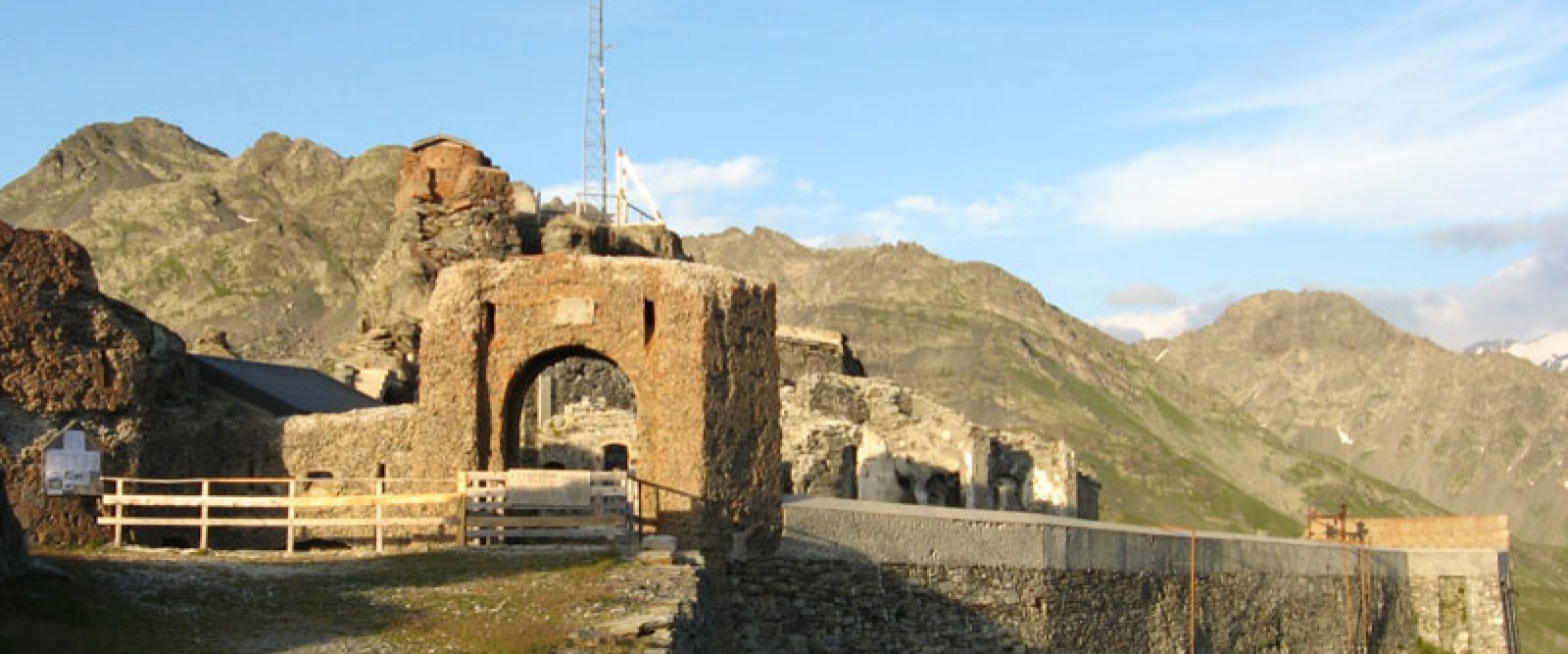
- The redoubt today
Date	21 December 1944; 23–31 March 1945 (1 week and 1 day); 27–29 April 1945 (2 days)
Location	Fort de la Redoute Ruinée
Result	Redoute Ruinée abandoned

Belligerents
Italian Social Republic; Germany	France

Commanders and leaders
(Italian Social Republic) Tito Agosti	(Provisional Government of the French Republic) Eugéne Molle

Strength
46 men	Unknown

The defense of the Redoute Ruinée in 1945 was an episode of the Second Battle of the Alps. The Fort de la Redoute Ruinée (Ruined Redoubt) was an old Piedmontese fort on the Col de la Traversette that had been re-built in the 19th century by France as a part of the Ligne Alpine. It defended the Little Saint Bernard Pass. During the Italian invasion of France in June 1940, the fort had been captured by Italy. In April 1945, it was held by the forces of the Italian Social Republic and came under attack by the French.

== Background ==
In early April 1945 the 4th Alpini Regiment of the 2nd Division Littorio held a long front running from Rifugio Benevolo near Rhêmes to La Forclaz, passing through several peaks including the Roc de Belleface and Traversette. On 10 April, the French captured the Roc de Belleface, but it was reoccupied by the Alpini and some German troops of the 100th Gebirgsjäger Regiment the following day. On April 25, the French 27th Alpine Infantry Division under General Eugène Molle was preparing to enter Italian territory (Val d'Aosta) across the Little Saint Bernard.

Between 23 and 25 April, the Germans abandoned their positions on the Aosta front, including the Redoute Ruinée. They were ordered to concentrate south of Ivrea. During their retreat, they were harassed by Italian partisans. Although they intended to blow up bridges and tunnels and render the highway (Statale 26) and railway unusable, the commander of the 4th Regiment, Lieutenant-Colonel Armando De Felice, threatened the German troops with retaliation to prevent demolitions. On 27 April, De Felice contacted Augusto Adam, the local leader of the partisans affiliated with the National Liberation Committee to secure his cooperation against any French invasion of Italian territory, which was given.

== French attacks ==
The French first attacked the Redoute Ruinée on 21 December 1944. On 23 March a second attack towards the Little Saint Bernard began. On 27 March, French artillery began pounding the Redoute Ruinée while the 13th Battalion of chasseurs alpins advanced on the fort. A heavy fog prevented accurate artillery spotting and the attack was called off. A second assault on 31 March resulted in the capture of Le Roc Noir, but the Redoute Ruinée held out. The offensive of 23–31 March "failed miserably".

By late April the Redoute Ruinée was garrisoned by a platoon of forty-six esploratori-arditi of the 4th Regiment under Antonio Rossitto. The chasseurs alpins attacked the fort on the nights of 27/8 and 28/9 April and there was serious fighting. On the morning of the 29 April, De Felice ordered all his positions on French soil, include the Redoute Ruinée, be abandoned. That day the French occupied the fort. It was, along with the Roc de Belleface, also occupied that day, the last pieces of French soil under Italian occupation.

The retreat of the Italians to their own territory was deliberately slow, at the suggestion of Adam, so as to deter the French. It was complete by the time the Surrender of Caserta took effect on 2 May. The 4th Alpini Regiment surrendered to American forces in Aosta on 4 May.
