= Château de la Fauconnière =

Château de la Fauconnière may refer to the following French châteaux:

- Château de la Fauconnière (Allier)
- Château de la Fauconnière (Vendée)
