= Battle of Authion =

1945 battle of World War II

- Part of Second Battle of the Alps
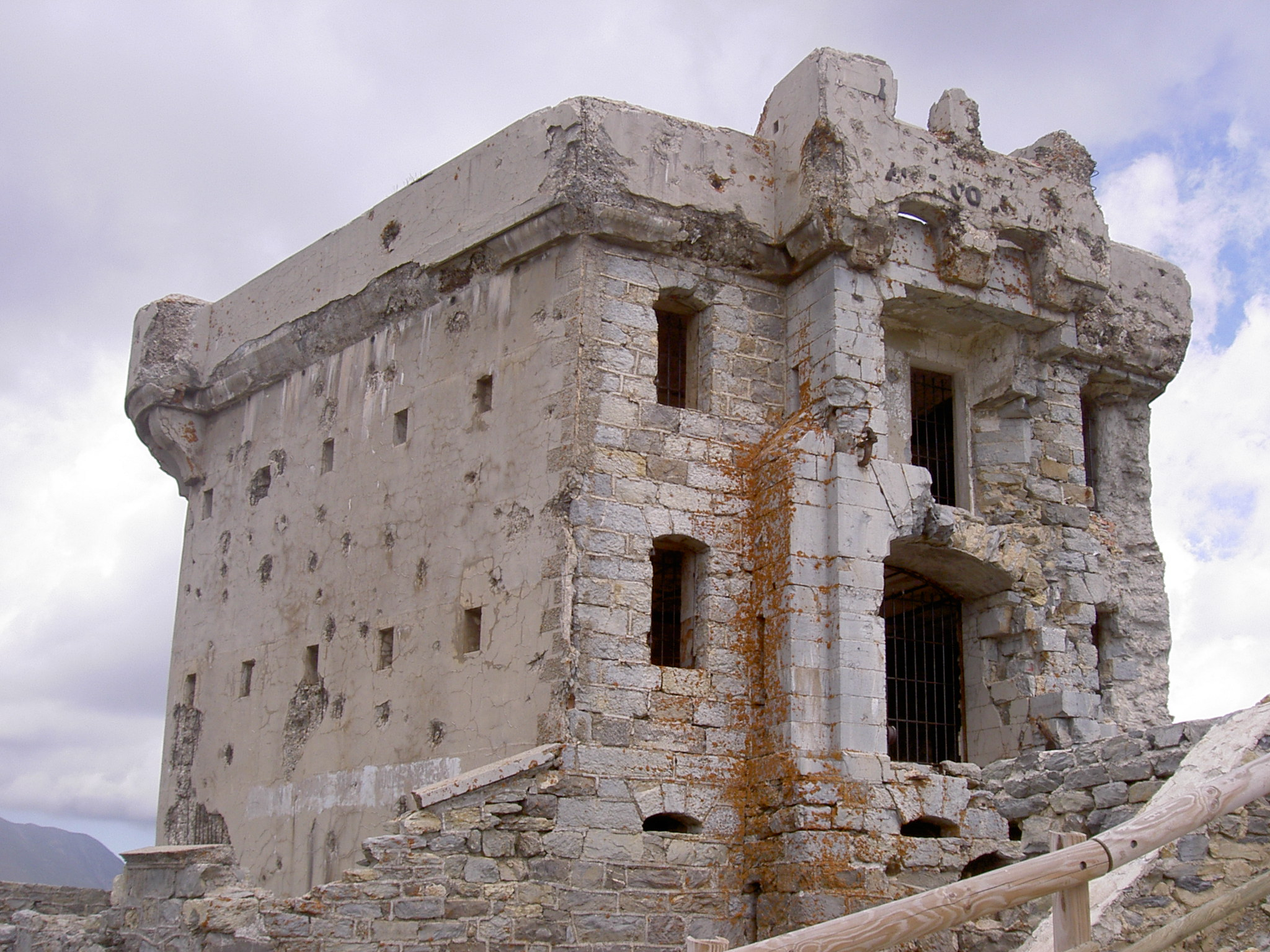
- The Redoute des Trois Communes in 2005, showing battle damage
| Date | 10–12 April 1945 (2 days) |
| Location | Authion massif, France 44°00′04″N 7°25′59″E |
| Result | Allied victory |

Belligerents
| Germany; Italian Social Republic | France; United States |

Commanders and leaders
| Theo-Helmut Lieb; Tito Agosti | Pierre Garbay |

Units involved
| (Nazi Germany) 34th Infantry Division; (Italian Social Republic) 2nd Division "Littorio" | 1st Free French Division; 1st Brigade; 2nd Brigade; 4th Brigade |

Strength
| Germany: 5,200 men Italy: 4,800 | 16,000 unknown number of planes, tanks and artillery |

Casualties and losses
| Germany: 120 killed 480 wounded 242 captured Italy: 5 killed 155 captured | 280 killed 1,000 wounded |

The Battle of Authion was a military engagement that took place towards the end of World War II, shortly before the defeat of Nazi Germany in 1945. Units of the French Army were sent to the French Alps to clear an important route from central France to Italy. A critical choke point was the 2,080 metre (6,820 feet) high Authion massif, held by determined but weakened German and Italian forces.

Field Marshal Harold Alexander authorised the assault on Authion on 10 April 1945.

== The Axis defences on Authion massif ==
The Authion massif has a height of 2,080 metre (6,820 feet), it dominates about 1.5 kilometres (0.93 mi) above the Alpine Valleys of Cairos, surrounded by steep slopes and deforested ravines. It is very difficult to access, only by a strategic path of switchbacks, containing mostly rocky ridges. This mountain range was crowned by important military works, namely Forca to the north and Milles Fourches to the south. These were strong, concrete protected forts topped with several meters of earth and locked by high gates and a deep ditch. There were also three towns in the northeast and east of the forts.

Authion was therefore of decisive strategic importance in this part of the Alps. The German Command had made this alpine area the very basis of their defensive system. A Bavarian battalion of the 34th Infantry Division held the fortifications. The flanks of the massif were covered by artillery fire. German troop reserves were stationed in the Roya Valley and were ready to intervene at threatened points. These forts were also protected by important defensive works, namely trenches, dense networks of barbed wire and anti-tank mines.

== Preparations ==
In the beginning of April 1945, the Command was informed that the Allies were to begin a general offensive on the Italian front. The offensive under the command of British Field Marshal Harold Alexander, was focused on capturing the highest point of the mountain. However, on that date the Germans were strongly established on all fronts and in particular on that of the Alps, so that no unit of the Axis could be beaten.

The date of the offensive on the Authion was therefore set to 9 April 1945. Unfortunately, due to particularly unfavorable weather in the Alpine area, marked by heavy snowfall and a total lack of visibility, the attack would begin at the dawn of 10 April 1945. The 1st Free French Division had reinforced its infantry with several elements. Their mission was to lead the first part of the attack and then to capture the dominant peaks in the East as soon as possible.

== The battle ==
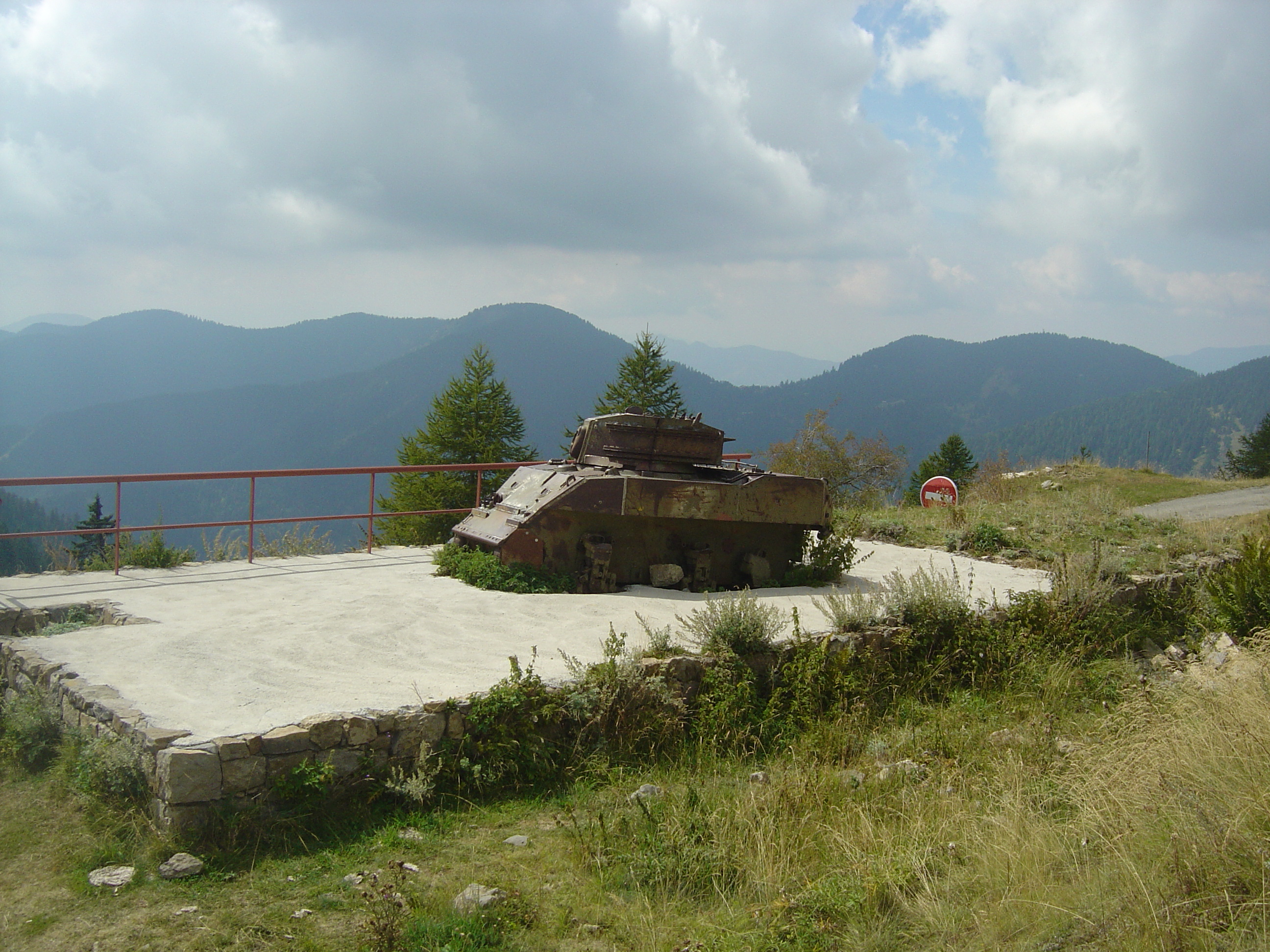
M5 Stuart lost during the battle and preserved as a monument at Cabanes-Vieilles.

At 09:15 on 10 April 1945, the French artillery stationed in Peira Cava, systematically shelled Fort de la Forca. The destruction wrought on this objective was relatively limited. The projectiles were of insufficient size to have any significant effect on the well-protected concrete structures.

At 09:30, two companies of the Bataillon d'Infanterie de Marine du Pacifique (BIMP) departed from Tueis. One of the companies went to the crest of the spur located between Fort de la Forca and the Trois Communes, the 2068-meter peak at the north of this spur. No progress beyond here was possible because of barbed wire and they were also under heavy fire by automatic weapons installed on the slope. The Piton northern spur quickly came under fire from the German armored turret so they couldn't move. However, they clung to the ground, making best use of the craters left by artillery shells, but many were killed while under fire from enemy mortars. The losses were increasing while the next arrival of reinforcements was 15 hours away, with only seven men operational on the ground.

At 17:30, with the support of an assault section, the armored turret was destroyed and all the spur could then be occupied. The other company took advantage of the fierce fighting to infiltrate the mountain road towards Cabanes Vieilles, passing without getting caught in the fire of the Forts of Forca and Milles Fourches. The company Commander Barberot used a bulldozer to make the route passable for light tanks.

Further to the right, a company of BMIX whose objective was the head of Vaiercaout, met with strong resistance from the enemy, forcing them to remain clinging on a slope and not reaching the top of this spur. Another company BMXI, climbing the rocky ridges of Mount Giagiabella was counterattacked on the way to its goal and had to retreat to its starting point.

In the north a company of scout skiers RIA 3, attached to the battalion reached the summit of Rauss. Around 17 hours after the start of the battle the 4th Brigade from the Lower Camp Silver, allowed a company of the BM21 (reinforced with assault section) to remove the concrete structure of the Col de Rauss.

To the south, the work of the 2nd Brigade to cover the right slope of the main operation was almost complete, and a group of 2nd Battalion North Africans (Commander Bertrand) seized Mangiapo and held it himself. At 19:00, a company of the 4th battalion (BM4) (Commander Buttin) occupied the top of Bosc. At noon a violent attack against the Germans starting from the Cross Cougoule, forced them to abandon the summit. Another company BM4, reinforced elements of an assault section, attacked the col de Brouis, but suffered heavy losses.

The results of this first day were quite minor, the Allies could not bite significantly into the enemy's defensive system, and the casualties were quite severe: 66 killed and wounded.

In the evening of the 10 April, Alexander decided to continue the offensive according to plan with a joint action on the Fort Miles Forts, by an assault group led by Lieutenant Colonel Lichtwitz. The assault group was a relatively recent creation at the time, specialised in the attacks of fortifications was armed with special weapons, especially bazookas and flamethrowers to complete the operation. The group had several assault sections, each section comprised six bazooka shooters, six submachine guns, grenade throwers, six flamethrowers and six machine guns. The section also had several light mortars with smoke shells.

The battle on 11 April 1945 began with a series German counterattacks. At 03:00 the enemy vainly tried to regain one of the mountain tops. At 06:30 the BIMP section which occupied the northern peak of the spur of the Forca, suffered another attack and had to retreat. At 08:00 before the combined attack of BIMP and light tanks, the Germans abandoned the Cabanes Vieilles Camps.

In the early afternoon, the BMXI held Parpella Vaiercaout. Four sections of the assault group, reinforced with two sections of BMXI, seized Fort Milles. At 15:00 the BIMP tried in vain to retake the north peak of the spur of Forca.

In the evening of the second day, a serious breach was finally made in the defence system of Authion and the Allies could now walk on the massif. The enemy however, was seemingly unwilling to yield their positions to the French. Their reactions early in the day, were always very violent. At 09:00 a company within the BIMP was stopped before reaching the spur of Forca. At 18:00 the forts were abandoned by the enemy, who retired on Beole. At 20:30 the garrison of Trois Communes, subjected to violent artillery fire, surrendered. At end of the day, the Axis forces began to falter. Prisoners confessed their astonishment at the presence of tanks in these places deemed impractical for such vehicles.

== Aftermath ==
12 April 1945 marked the final day and success of the operation conducted on the Authion, which ended the Second World War in France and made a clear path for the Allies to Italy.
