= Paul-André Doyen =

French Army general (1881-1974)

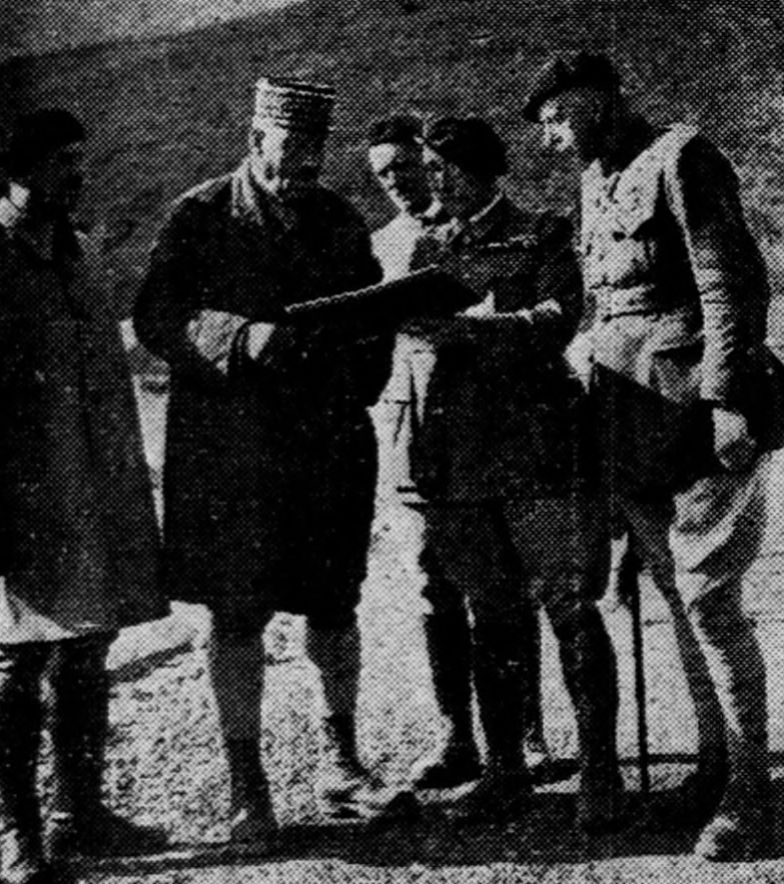
- General Doyen (on the right) in 1938
- Born: 21 June 1881; Cabanac-et-Villagrains, Nouvelle-Aquitaine, France
- Died: 3 September 1974 (aged 93); Veyrier-du-Lac, Haute-Savoie, France
- Military career
- Allegiance: France
- Branch: French Army
- Service years: 1914–1941; 1945–1946
- Rank: General
- Commands: 1940 27th Mountain Infantry Brigade; 1940 18th Army Corps
- Conflicts: World War I World War II * 1940 Battle of France * 1945 Second Battle of the Alps

Paul-André Doyen (Cabanac-et-Villagrains, 21 June 1881 – Veyrier-du-Lac, 3 September 1974), was a French general from World War II.

== Biography ==
He studied at Saint-Cyr and fought in World War I, where he was serverly wounded in July 1918.

In February 1939, he took command of the 27th Alpine Infantry Division and in May 1940 of the 18th Army Corps, with which he fought in the Battle of France. From September 1940 to August 1941, he was head of the French delegation to the German Armistice Commission.

After this, he retired from the Army and was put under house arrest by the Vichy Regime. Called back to service in February 1945 by General de Gaulle, he commanded at the end of the war, from March to May 1945, the French troops on the front of the Alps. Leading the Army Detachment of the Alps during the Second Battle of the Alps, his forces penetrated into Italy and made contact with the 5th American Army commanded by General Clark. Plans of de Gaulle to annex conquered territories of the Aosta Valley, Piedmont and Liguria, where thwarted by the Americans, and the French were forced to withdraw in June 1945.

After the war, he was military governor of Lyon from 1945 to 1946. He was a witness for the prosecution during the trial of Marshal Pétain.

== Sources ==
- Generals.dk
- French Wikipedia
