= Château de la Fauconnière (Allier) =

Castle in Allier, Auvergne, France

- Location in France

General information
- Type: Château
- Location: Near Gannat, Allier, Auvergne, France
- Coordinates: 46.101°N 3.155°E

The Château de la Fauconnière is a castle near Gannat in Allier, Auvergne, France.

== Location ==
The castle is located near the town of Gannat and the ruins of the Château de Chiroux.

== History ==
Legend has it that the land was used by the dukes of Bourbon on their hunts.

The land belonged to Pierre Filliot, who was born in the castle, then a primitive structure with four towers and arrowslits. In 1518, he asked Anne of France to make it a fiefdom. Once this request was granted, Filliot added a terrace. After his death, the castle was inherited by his nephew, Philippe Filliot, who was the seigneur, or Lord, of Marcelange. The latter married Elizabeth de Favières, and they had a daughter, Marie Filliot de la Fauconnière, who in 1694 married Hughes de Fontanges, a knight and seigneur of Hauteroche. The castle was inherited by their son, Hughes de Fontanges, in 1722, who married Lady Marie-Gasparde de Boissieux in 1738. The castle was inherited by their third son, Viscount François de Fontanges, who served as the governor of the Southern part of Saint-Domingue (now known as Haiti).

In the summer of 1940, the château was home to a "High center for the training of leaders of the General Youth Secretariat at Vichy", under the leadership of Captain Pierre Dunoyer de Segonzac. The aim was to train the French elite in the spirit of the Revolution nationale heralded by Marshal Philippe Pétain. Later that year, the school was moved to the Château d'Uriage, where it became known as the Ecole Nationale des Cadres de la Jeunesse.
