= French invasion of Italy =

French invasion of Italy may refer to:

- French invasions of Italy (Renaissance Wars) as part of the Italian Wars
  - The French invasion of Italy as part of the Italian War of 1494–1495
- The Napoleonic invasion of Italy from 1792 to 1801
- Second Battle of the Alps in World War II
