= 134th Infantry Division (Wehrmacht) =

- 134. Infanterie-Division
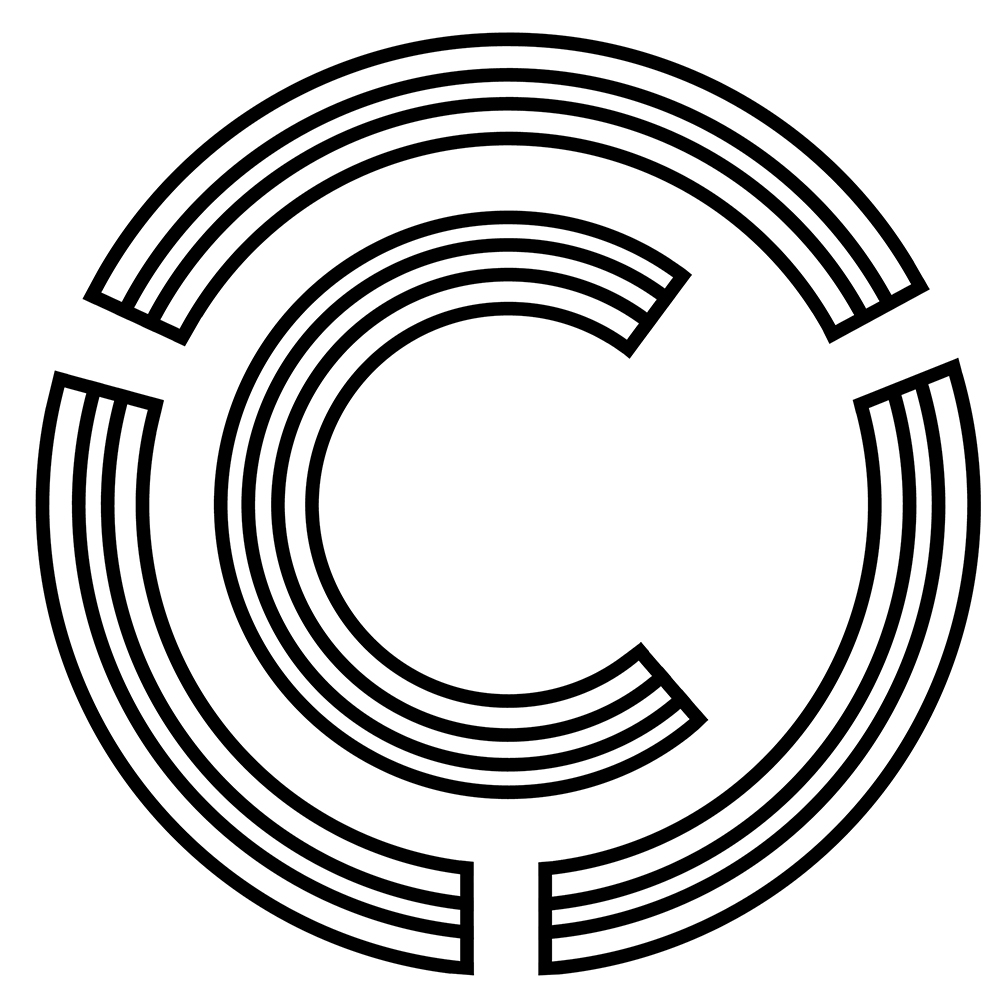
- Active: October 1940 – June 1944
- Country: Nazi Germany
- Branch: Army
- Type: Infantry
- Size: Division
- Engagements: World War II: Operation Barbarossa; Battle of Kursk; Battle of Smolensk (1943); Operation Bagration

The 134th Infantry Division (German: 134. Infanterie-Division) was a German division in World War II. It was formed in October 1940.

From June 1941, the 134th Infantry Division took part in the invasion of the Soviet Union as part of the Army Group Center. In December 1941, the division was involved in the Battle of Moscow. Together with the 45th Infantry Division, she was temporarily surrounded as part of the 2nd Army at Livny and lost a large part of her artillery. The division was destroyed in the Soviet Bobruysk Offensive, part of Operation Bagration in the summer of 1944.

== Orders of Battle ==
=== 134. Infanterie-Division 1940 ===
- Infanterie-Regiment 439
- Infanterie-Regiment 445
- Infanterie-Regiment 446
- Artillerie-Regiment 134
- Aufklärungs-Abteilung 134
- Pionier-Bataillon 134
- Panzerjäger-Abteilung 134
- Divisions-Nachrichten-Abteilung 134
- Divisions-Nachschubführer 134

=== 134. Infanterie-Division 1944 ===
- Grenadier-Regiment 439
- Grenadier-Regiment 445
- Grenadier-Regiment 446
- Artillerie-Regiment 134
- Divisions-Füsilier-Bataillon 134
- Panzerjäger-Abteilung 134
- Pionier-Bataillon 134
- Feldersatz-Bataillon 134
- Divisions-Nachrichten-Abteilung 134
- Divisions-Nachschubführer 134

== Commanding officers ==
- Generalleutnant Conrad von Cochenhausen, 5 October 1940 – 12 December 1941, (committed suicide after the defeat at Livny)
- General Hans Schlemmer, 12 December 1941 – February 1944,
- Generalmajor Rudolf Bader, February 1944 – 1 June 1944,
- Generalleutnant Ernst Philipp, 1 June 1944 – 29 June 1944 (committed suicide after the destruction of his division).

== Bibliography ==
- Tessin, Georg (1973). Verbände und Truppen der deutschen Wehrmacht und Waffen–SS im Zweiten Weltkrieg 1939–1945 [Units and Troops of the German Military and Waffen-SS in the Second World War 1939–1945] (in German). Vol. 7: Die Landstreitkräfte 131–200 (Units 131–200). Osnabrück: Biblio. ISBN 3-7648-0872-1.
