= Second Battle of the Alps =

1944/45 campaign on the French/Italian border

- Part of the Western Front of World War II
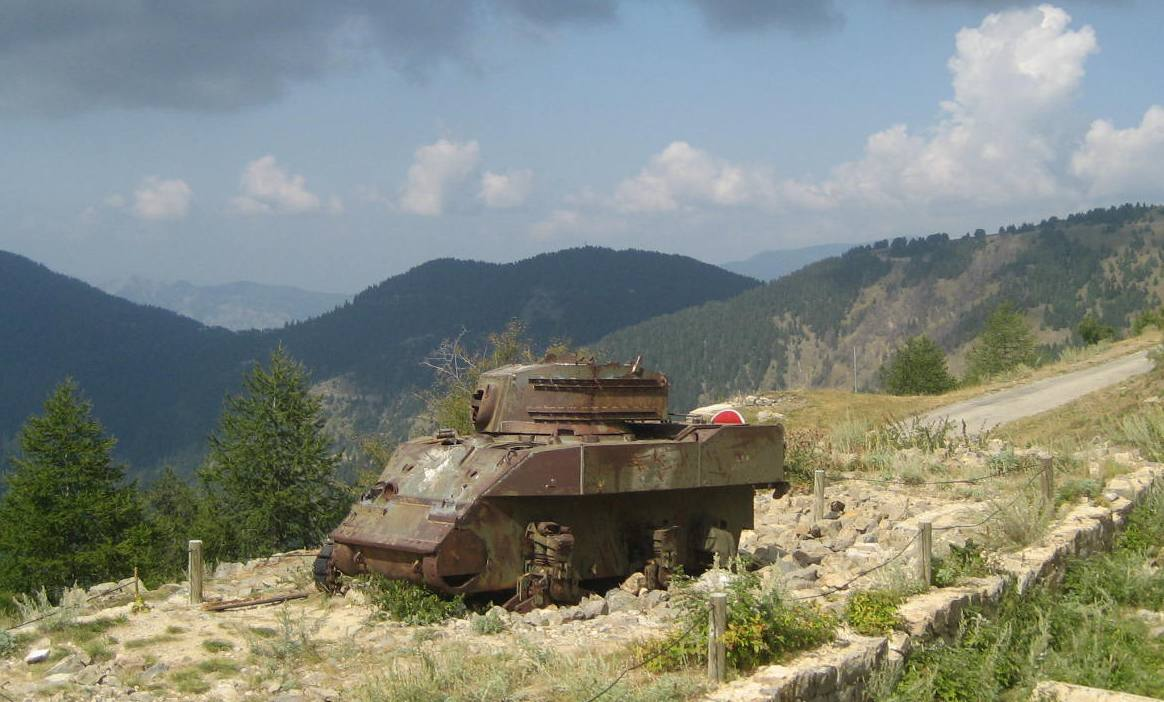
- Stuart tank preserved as memorial to the Battle of Authion
Date	21 December 1944 – 2 May 1945 (4 months, 1 week and 4 days)
Location	Franco-Italian border
Result	See Aftermath
Territorial changes	Tende and La Brigue annexed by France after a plebiscite

Belligerents
France; United States Italian Resistance	Italian Social Republic; (Nazi Germany) Germany

Commanders and leaders
(Provisional Government of the French Republic) Paul-André Doyen (United States) Jacob L. Devers	(Italian Social Republic) Rodolfo Graziani (Nazi Germany) Hans Schlemmer

Strength
40,000 men	4 divisions (2 Italian, 2 German)

Casualties and losses
2,287 casualties: 393 killed 1,730 wounded 164 missing or captured	1,453 casualties: 800 killed or wounded 653 captured

The Second Battle of the Alps (French: deuxième bataille des Alpes; Italian: seconda battaglia delle Alpi) was a military campaign fought between combined German and Italian Social Republic forces, and the re-established French Republic led by Charles de Gaulle and other Allied forces.

== Background ==
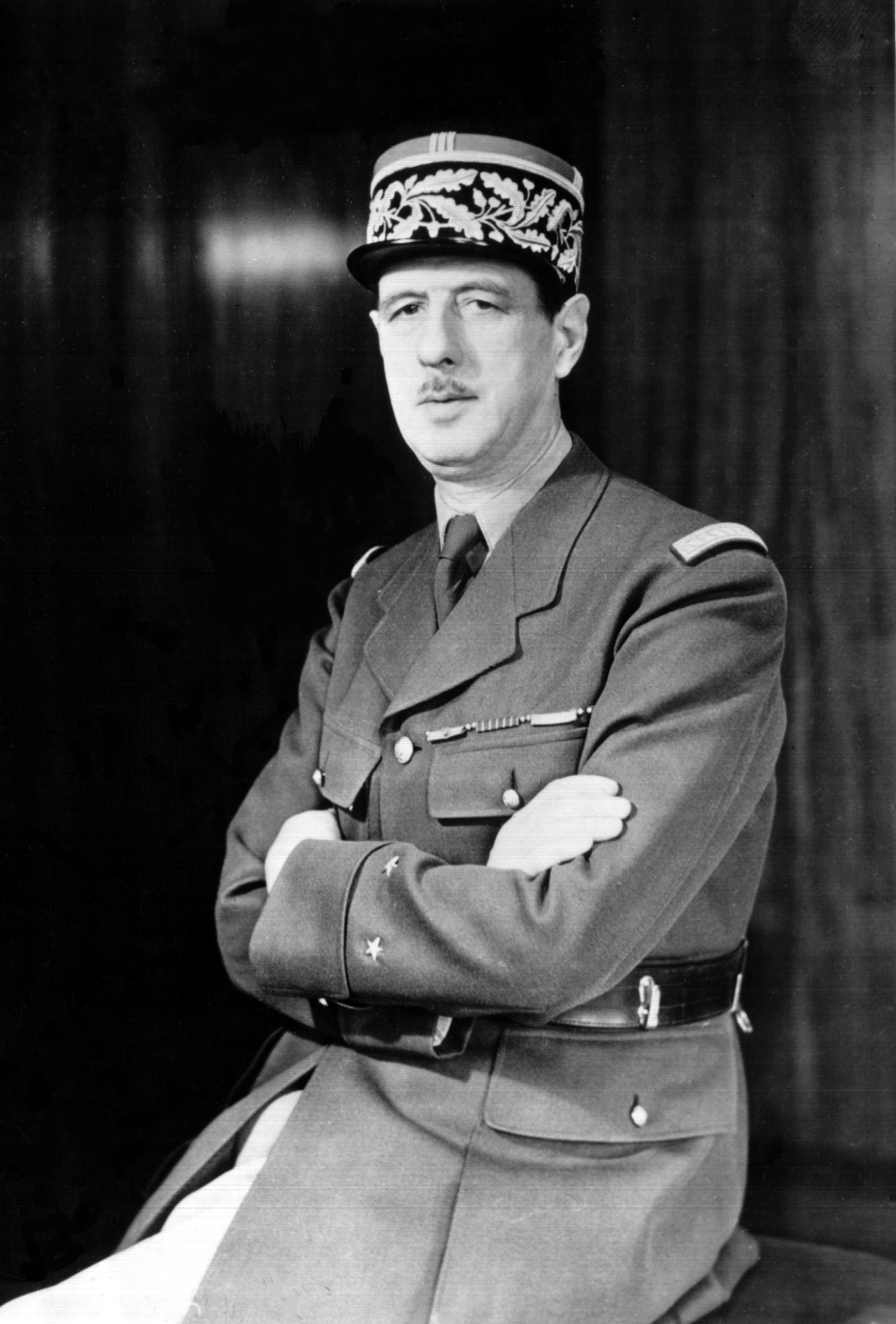
Charles de Gaulle

Since 1943, French general Charles de Gaulle, head of the Free French forces, had been planning revenge against Italy for the "stab in the back", the invasion of southern France ordered by Benito Mussolini in June 1940, while France was falling to Germany during the Battle of France. While in Algiers de Gaulle began studying a plan for occupying Italian territory with French influences: the Aosta Valley, western Piedmont, and the coastal cities of Ventimiglia and Imperia in Liguria. The Armistice of Cassibile however caused the division of the Italian peninsula between the Kingdom of Italy in the south, under King Victor Emmanuel III, and the Italian Social Republic in the north, led by Mussolini under German influence. The conditions of the Armistice made the United States, the United Kingdom and the Italian Co-belligerent Army the only nations permitted to occupy Italian territory, thereby leaving out the French. After Operation Dragoon, the invasion of Southern France, the Allies were able to bring the campaign up to the Alps by the Autumn of 1944.

During 1945 de Gaulle was able to send soldiers and partisans to help the Italian resistance near the city of Aosta, and could have occupied a territory of 20 km from the Franco-Italian border if necessary. The general used this excuse to gather a large number of soldiers near the front, ready to conquer as much Italian land as possible from the Aosta Valley to Liguria. French spies were sent to spread French propaganda to gain the population's support during the invasion, but the majority of Italian citizens did not want to join France. French soldiers retreated in the summer of 1945, except from the villages of Tende and Brigue, which were later annexed with the peace treaty (1947). A significant part of the population left the two villages to avoid having to become French citizens.

== Forces ==
=== French forces ===
Between November 1944 and March 1945 France set up the Détachement d'Armées des Alpes (Army Detachment of the Alps) under General Paul-André Doyen, an officer of the Chasseurs alpins who was recalled into active service for the occasion.

In the Northern part of the theatre the main French unit was the 27th Alpine Infantry Division which was formed from local French Resistance units, among whom some were veterans of the defense of the Alps in 1940. Within its ranks were some of France's foremost mountaineers including Lionel Terray, Maurice Herzog, Jacques Boell and Honoré Bonnet. However the overall level of training was poor and the division was starved of equipment and supplies which the Americans preferred to channel towards the more important offensive into Germany.

Further south in the Alpes-Maritimes the 1st Free French Division was deployed under General Pierre Garbay. This was a well-equipped and well-trained unit which had acquired extensive combat experience in different theatres of war. It comprised three brigades of motorised infantry (1st, 2nd and 4th) an armoured reconnaissance regiment, the 1er Régiment de Fusiliers Marins equipped with Stuart tanks, an artillery regiment and various support units. Various units were attached to the division for the offensive. These included the former FFI 3rd Alpine infantry regiment, a company of ski scouts and various ad hoc units. The bulk of the French troops, some 30,000 men, were deployed in the southern part of the front, whereas the units in the northern sector numbered only a few thousand. This choice was partly due to political considerations as French claims on Italian territory in the southern sector, namely the districts of Tende and La Brigue, were more likely to be accepted by the international community.

The French troops on the alpine front were subordinate to General Jacob L. Devers' 6th Army Group though in practice they received their instructions from the French Army headquarters and thus from de Gaulle himself. At first they were assigned the strictly defensive mission of defending the 6th Army Group's supply lines. However, Devers later authorized an attack in order to support the Allied offensive in Italy, with the French being allowed to advance up to 20 km inside Italian territory.

=== German and Italian forces ===
The defense of the Franco-Italian border was entrusted to LXXV Army Corps, under General der Gebirgstruppe Hans Schlemmer of General Rodolfo Graziani's Army Group Liguria, with all Axis forces in the area coming under its purview.

The German forces belonged to the 34th Infantry Division and to the 5th Gebirgsjäger Division. The Gebirgsjäger were an elite troop recruited among the mountainous regions of Tyrol and Bavaria. Their division included a unit of expert mountaineers, the Lehrbattalion Mittenwald. The 34th Division, led by General Theo-Helmut Lieb, was an experienced unit that had fought for 3 years on the Eastern Front.

Axis defenses relied heavily on French fortifications, both from the 19th century Séré de Rivières system and from the Alpine Line of Maginot forts, as well as on the Italian Alpine Wall. In 1943 a detailed inspection had convinced the Germans to halt the dismantlement of the French forts by Organisation Todt, in order to use them against a possible Allied offensive from Italy. In the summer of 1944, with the imminence of a landing in southern France plans were drawn for holding the front in that direction with a force of two German divisions, though an offensive through the Alps was judged unlikely.

The Italian forces were mainly formed by two divisions, the 4th Alpine Division "Monterosa" under General Giorgio Milazzo and the 2nd Division "Littorio" under General Tito Agosti, and the Parachute regiment Folgore, all of which were under German operational control. The Monterosa and Littorio divisions were trained in Germany before being deployed on the front and had a mixture of German and Italian weapons. Graziani allocated them to the Western Alps to defend the Franco-Italian border. Conscripted from Italian prisoners in German labour camps, the troops were mainly opposed or indifferent to fascism and consequently suffered from low morale. They were chosen among natives of German-controlled areas of Italy so that reprisals could be taken against their families in case of desertion. Despite these measures, desertion remained a problem and the Germans were forced to deploy officers and NCOs in Italian units.

=== Italian partisans ===
The partisan brigades were mainly formed by the Alpini too, and had planned the defence on the mountains and the conquest of the last Aostan cities still controlled by the fascist Italian Folgore regiment, the Decima Flottiglia MAS and some German units.

The major part of the partisan forces was however sent to prevent the Germans retreating to Germany from causing massacres and violence against the civilians.

== Campaign ==
=== Little Saint Bernard ===
The French first attacked the Fort de la Redoute Ruinée defending the Little Saint Bernard pass on 21 December 1944. Between 23 and 31 March they attacked the forts defending the pass a second time, but strong resistance and bad weather resulted in failure.

In early April 1945 the 4th Alpini Regiment of the Littorio Division and the Germans of the 100th ''Gebirgsjäger'' Regiment held a front running from Rhêmes to La Forclaz. On the 10 April, the French began a series of attacks in the direction of the Little Saint Bernard. Between 23 and 25 April, the Italians and Germans abandoned their positions on the Aosta front. By the 25 April the French were preparing to cross into Italian territory.

With serious fighting around the Fort de la Redoute Ruinée, on the morning of the 29 April, the Alpini commander, Lt-Col Armando De Felice, ordered the evacuation of all his positions on French soil. That day the French occupied the fort. It was, along with the Roc de Belleface, also occupied that day, the last pieces of French soil under Italian occupation.

=== Mont Cenis ===
Codenamed Operation Izard, the attack on the Mont Cenis pass began on the 5 April. It was carried out by the 3,000 men of the 7th Half-brigade of Chasseurs Alpins belonging to the 27th Alpine Division, led by Colonel Alain Le Ray, reinforced by two batteries of heavy artillery from the 1st Free French Division. The position was defended by a battalion of the 5th Gebirgsjäger Division and another battalion from the Paratroop Regiment Folgore supported by German artillery, in all some 1,500 men.

The operation opened with an attack on the German observation post at the Pointe de Bellecombe (2750m), which was reached after a 600m night climb in difficult weather. The post was destroyed, but a counter-attack forced the Chasseurs off the feature later the same day. The main objective for the French was the old fort at Mont-Froid which commanded the surrounding areas. After gaining a foothold in the fort on the 5 April, French forces finally captured it after several days of confused fighting at close quarters. However, an attack against the Fort de la Turra was a failure, and the offensive stalled when the heavy artillery units were withdrawn for the operation against the Authion massif. On the 12 April a perfectly executed counter-attack by the Gebirgsjäger and the troops of the Folgore recaptured the fort and evicted the French from the Mont-Cenis plateau.

The failure of Operation Izard had severe consequences for Doyen's force as it persuaded the Americans to withhold further supplies for the offensive. The Mont-Cenis pass was captured only on the 27 April after Axis forces had retreated from the area.

=== Battle of Authion ===
Between the 10 and the 12 April 1945, French forces took control of the Authion massif. The massif was defended by several forts held by German forces of the 34th Division under General Lieb and Italians of the Littorio Division under General Agosti. The fighting resulted in over 200 French and over 100 Germans dead.

=== Col de Larche ===
The Col de Larche, linking the Ubaye valley via a tributary, the Ubayette, to the Valle Stura di Demonte, was defended by several Maginot forts, the Ouvrage Roche-la-Croix, Ouvrage Saint Ours Haut and Ouvrage Saint Ours Bas held by German and Italian troops.

An assault was launched on the 22 April by French forces including elements of the 159th, 99th and 141st Alpine infantry regiments, and the 5th Dragoon Regiment which was the reconnaissance unit of the 27th Alpine Division. They were supported by aviation and an artillery unit detached from the 1st Free French Division. After a violent artillery preparation French forces captured the village of Larche, cutting off the forts from their rear and in the evening Roche la Croix fell after a brief fight. On the 23 April, Saint-Ours Haut was found to have been abandoned and was captured without a fight, but Saint-Ours Bas had to be taken by storm. The French employed the next day in obtaining the surrender of isolated pockets of resistance but their artillery unit had to be withdrawn which led to some reorganisation. On the 26 April the offensive was due to be renewed against the col itself but this was found to have been abandoned by the Axis forces. Fighting in the area cost the French 15 killed and 38 injured while the Axis lost 34 killed and 150 captured.

== Aosta Valley Crisis ==
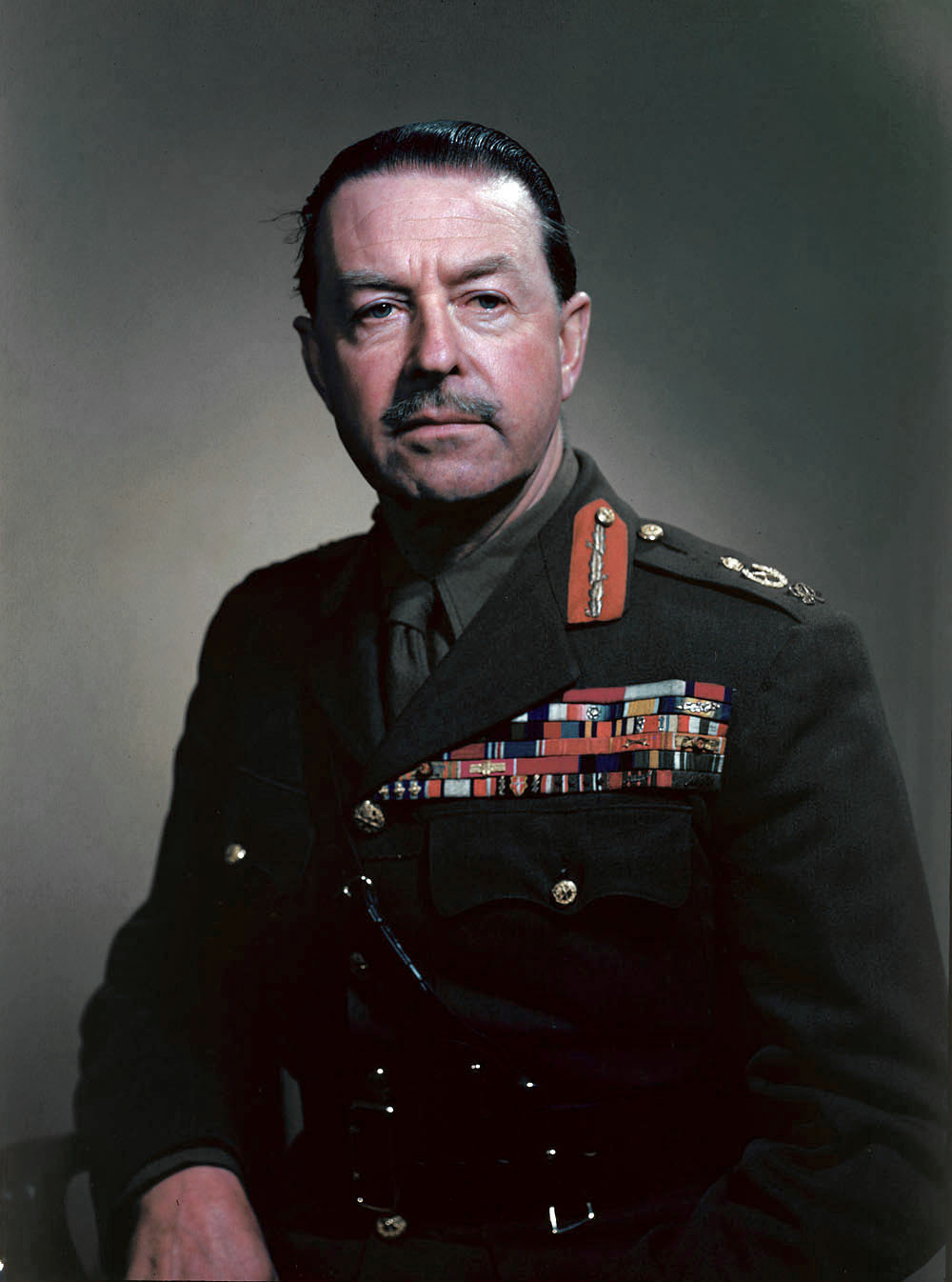
Field Marshal Harold Alexander

British Field Marshal Harold Alexander who was Supreme Allied Commander in the Mediterranean theatre established a military government in the north under plans already agreed by the British and American governments. French forces were permitted by the Allies to penetrate Italy to a depth of 30 kilometres (19 mi) following the Axis collapse in May 1945, although in some places they violated this permission and penetrated much further. After the war, Alexander ordered General Paul-André Doyen to withdraw the Armée des Alpes behind the Franco-Italian border but the general, under orders from de Gaulle, refused.

In messages between the Combined Chiefs of Staff it was reported that General Doyen had threatened to prevent the setting up of the Allied Military Government in Aosta claiming that his orders came from de Gaulle's provisional French Government. American president Truman appealed directly to de Gaulle warning him that under the circumstances he had no choice but to cut off US military supplies and ammunition but would continue to provide rations. French General Juin arrived the next day at Alexander's headquarters in order to clear up any misunderstanding. It was agreed that the French would immediately withdraw from Aosta Valley and Susa but would delay their withdrawal from Tende in order to save face because a hasty withdrawal would be hurtful to French amour-propre. The last French soldiers withdrew from Ventimiglia a month later.

This was the final act of the Italian campaign.

== Aftermath ==
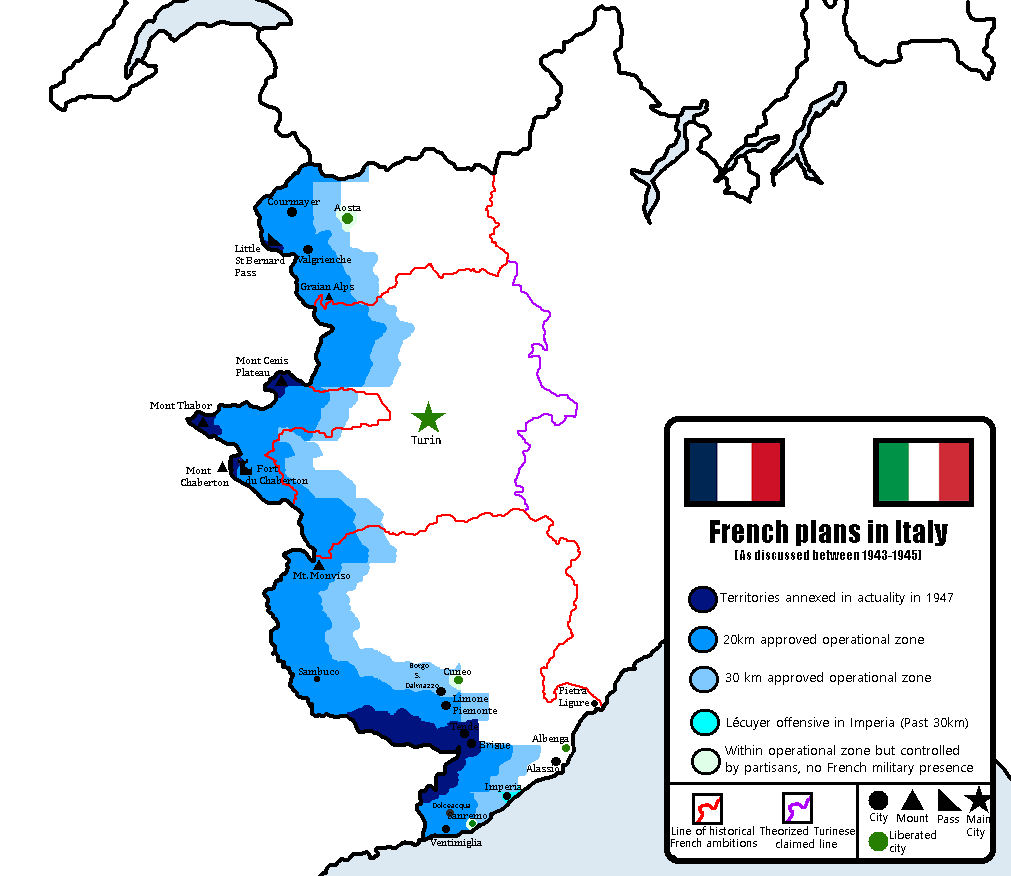
Map of French operations, gains, plans during the last year of World War II and the subsequent treaty.

De Gaulle had been checked by the British and Americans and would have little input in the subsequent reconstruction of Italy. In addition the Italian democratic parties became disillusioned by de Gaulle and accused him of trying to assert potential French leadership in subsequent Franco-Italian relations. The plans of de Gaulle to annex territories of the Aosta Valley, Piedmont and Liguria could therefore be classed as a failure.

After the Treaties of Paris between the new governments of both France and Italy some adjustments were made on the Franco-Italian border, considered as a punishment for Italy joining the Axis in 1940. The border with France was only slightly modified in favour of France, mostly in uninhabited Alpine areas (except for the Tende valley and La Brigue) thus remaining largely the same as in 1860.

L'ultima battaglia delle Alpi or La dernière bataille des Alpes (The Last Battle of the Alps) is a 2010 Franco-Italian documentary about the attempted annexation of the Italian territories by the French. It contains interviews with French and Italian veterans that fought in the Alps during 1945.

== Bibliography ==
- Cook, Don (1983). Charles De Gaulle: A Biography (3 ed.). G.P. Putnam's. ISBN 9780399128585.
- Dempsey, Louis Roger. "L'intervention anglo-américaine en Vallée d'Aoste, Italie, en 1945". Le Flambeau 3–4 (1972).
- Doyen, Paul-André (1948). La Campagne du détachement d'armée des Alpes (mars, avril, mai 1945). B. Arthaud.
- Girard, Joseph. "La participation des F.F.I. à la libération des Alpes-Maritimes", Cahiers de la Méditerranée 12 (1976), pp. 17–28.
- Klingbeil, Pierre-Emmanuel (2005). Le front oublié des Alpes-Maritimes (15 août 1944 – 2 mai 1945). Serre Editeur. ISBN 2-86410-422-9.
- Kundahl, George G. (2017). Riviera at War: World War II on the Côte d'Azur. I. B. Tauris.
- Lamb, Richard (1993). War in Italy, 1943–1945: A Brutal Story. Da Capo Press.
- Lipgens, Walter (1982). A History of European Integration: 1945-1947 Volume 1. Clarendon Press. ISBN 9780198225874.
- Morel, Bernard; Lesueur, Gérard (2012). La Ligne Maginot en Haute Ubaye: Forts de Roche-la-Croix et du Haut de Saint-Ours. Barcelonette: Association pour la valorisation du patrimoine de l'Ubaye. ISBN 978-2-9081-0305-2.
- Paxton, Robert O; Wahl, Nicholas, eds. (1994). De Gaulle and the United States: A Centennial Reappraisal. Berg. ISBN 9780854969982.
- Riccioli, Jean-Louis (1996). "La deuxième bataille des Alpes : printemps 1945". Cahiers de la Méditerranée (in French). 52 (1): 93–118. doi:10.3406/camed.1996.1161. ISSN 0395-9317.
- Ring, Jim (2014). Storming the Eagle's Nest: Hitler's War in the Alps. Faber & Faber. ISBN 978-0571282395.
- Rowland, Benjamin M, ed. (2011). Charles de Gaulle's Legacy of Ideas. Lexington Books. ISBN 9780739164549.
- Wall, Irwin M (1991). The United States and the Making of Postwar France, 1945-1954. Cambridge University Press. ISBN 9780521402170.
- Wildgen, John K. "The Liberation of the Valle d'Aosta, 1943–1945", Journal of Modern History, 42, 1 (1970), pp. 21–41.
