= Fort de la Redoute Ruinée =

French fort

Coordinates: 45°39′25.4″N 6°52′29.3″E

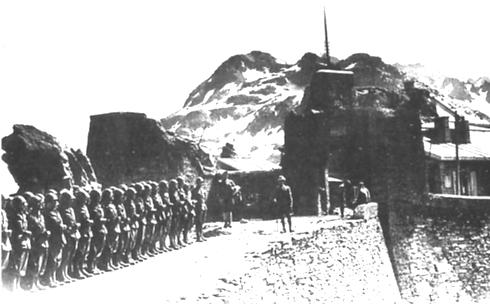
Italian soldiers conquering the fort in 1940.

The Fort de la Redoute Ruinée (literally "fort of the ruined redoubt") was a French fort overlooking the Col de la Traversette near La Rosière in the Alps between 1892 and 1945. It was built out of the ruins of the Fort de la Traversette, constructed in 1630 by Savoy. In 1792, during the French Revolutionary Wars, the Savoyards garrisoned the old fort with fifty men. Nonetheless, it fell to the French army in 1794 and was renamed Fort Libre ("fort free"). The fort became permanently French with the exchange of territory that accompanied the Treaty of Turin in 1860.

Between 1892 and 1894, the French constructed new works on the old. In 1897 the fort was unveiled by President Félix Faure and named in honour of the old fort. It was incorporated into the sub-sector of Tarentaise of the fortified sector of Savoy, part of the Alpine Line extension of the Maginot Line in the 1930s. It did not see action until the Italian invasion of France in June 1940. Garrisoned with seventy men plus machine guns commanded by Sous-lieutenant Henry Desserteaux, it withstood the Italian besiegers for four days before the Franco-Italian armistice. On 3 July, eight days after the armistice, the surrendered garrison marched out with the honours of war. In the winter of 1944–45, the fort was used by the Italians and Germans. A garrison of forty-six soldiers defended it against French attacks during the second Battle of the Alps. It was retaken by France on 29 April 1945.

After it returned to French control, it was renamed Baraquement Capitaine Desserteaux (Capitain Desserteaux Barracks).

== Sources ==
- Berthier, Bruno; Bornecque, Robert (2001). Pierres fortes de Savoie. La Fontaine de Siloé.
- Rochat, Giorgio (2008). "La campagne italienne de juin 1940 dans les Alpes occidentales". Revue historique des armées. 250: 77–84, in 29 paragraphs online. doi:10.3917/rha.250.0077.
