= LXXV Army Corps =

LXXV. Armeekorps
- Active: 15 January 1944 – May 1945
- Country: Nazi Germany
- Branch: Army
- Size: Corps
- Engagements: World War II: Italian campaign

LXXV Army Corps (LXXV. Armeekorps) was a corps in the German Army during World War II.

== Commanders ==
- General der Infanterie Anton Dostler, 15 January 1944 – 2 July 1944
- General der Gebirgstruppe Hans Schlemmer, 2 July 1944 – May 1945

== Operations ==
The LXXV. Army Corps was created on 15 January 1944 in Frankfurt am Main in military district IX.

On January 24, 1944, the Corps was put on transport, via Munich and Verona to Liguria. The Corps became responsible for the coastal defence of the Ligurian coast, as well as anti-partisan actions, and construction of fortifications on Elba and around Genoa, La Spezia and Livorno. This lasted until mid-July 1944, when the front line reached Liguria from the south.

The Corps was now deployed against the Allied armies on the westernmost part of the Italian front. Between 17 and 20 August 1944, the Corps was pulled back from the front and moved to the area around Turin. This was in response to the Allied landings in the south of France, which created the danger that these troops would move into Italy via the Alpine passes. The Corps was commissioned to form a front in the Western Alps. The Corps held its position against the French in the Second Battle of the Alps until April 1945.

After the Allied spring offensive was launched in April 1945, the Corps was attacked from behind and forced to capitulate together with the rest of the Axis troops in Italy.

== Composition ==
- 34th Infantry Division (Wehrmacht),
- 5th Mountain Division (Wehrmacht)
- Italian 2nd Infantry Division "Littorio"
- Bulk of the Italian 4th Alpini Division "Monte Rosa"

== See also ==
- List of German corps in World War II

== Source ==
- "LXXV. Armeekorps". Lexikon der Wehrmacht.
