= Redoute des Trois Communes =

French fort in Saorge, Alpes-Maritimes

- Saorge, France
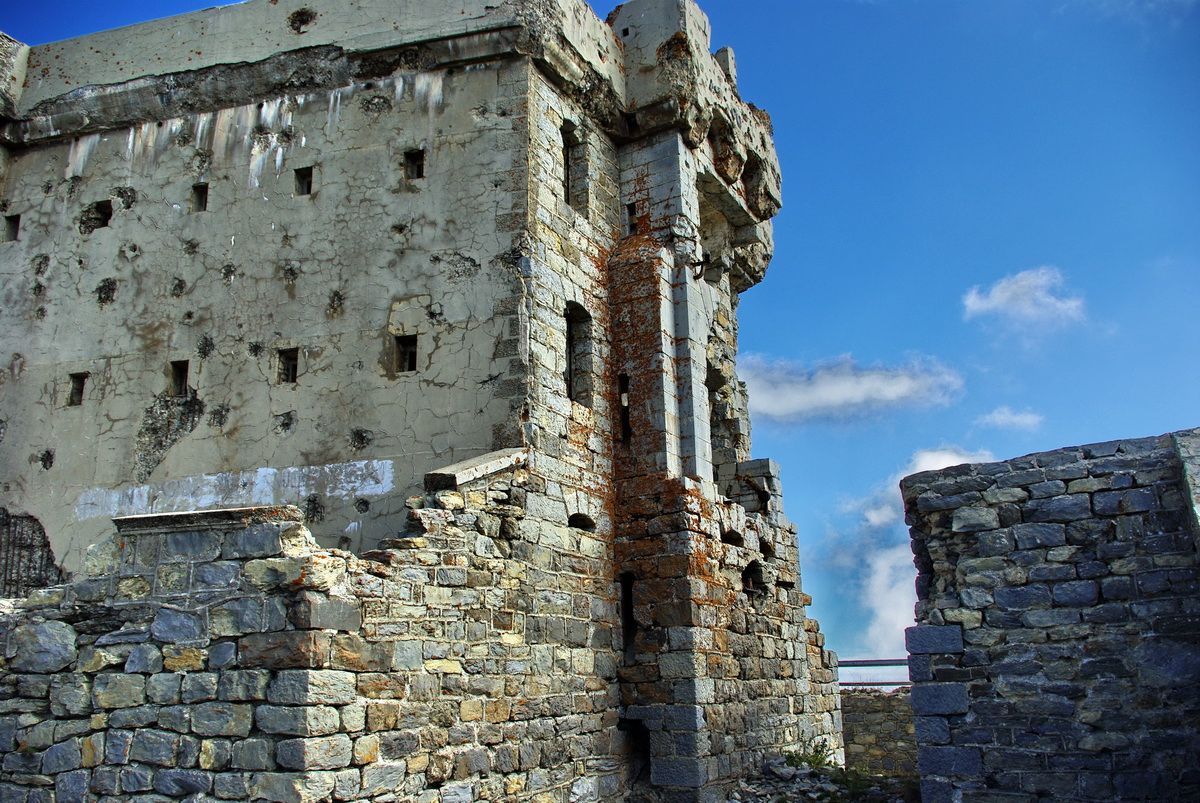

Site information
- Type: Fort, Séré de Rivières system
- Controlled by: France
- Open to the public: No
- Condition: In ruins

Location
- Coordinates: 44°00′04″N 7°25′59″E

Site history
- Built: 1897–1899
- Battles/wars: Battle of Authion

The Redoute des Trois Communes is a French fort, located in the commune of Saorge, Alpes-Maritimes.

Built in 1897 as part of the Séré de Rivières system, it was one of the first French forts to be constructed of reinforced concrete. Situated at an altitude of 2080 metres at the highest summit of the Authion massif, it was intended to defend the Franco-Italian border.

During World War II, the redoubt was held by German troops of the 34th division. It saw combat when the French offensive during the battle of Authion. On April 12, after artillery and aviation strikes, it was approached by 5 volunteers of the 1st Free French Division supported by a tank, who obtained the surrender of the 38-strong garrison.
