= Mont Froid =

Mountain in France

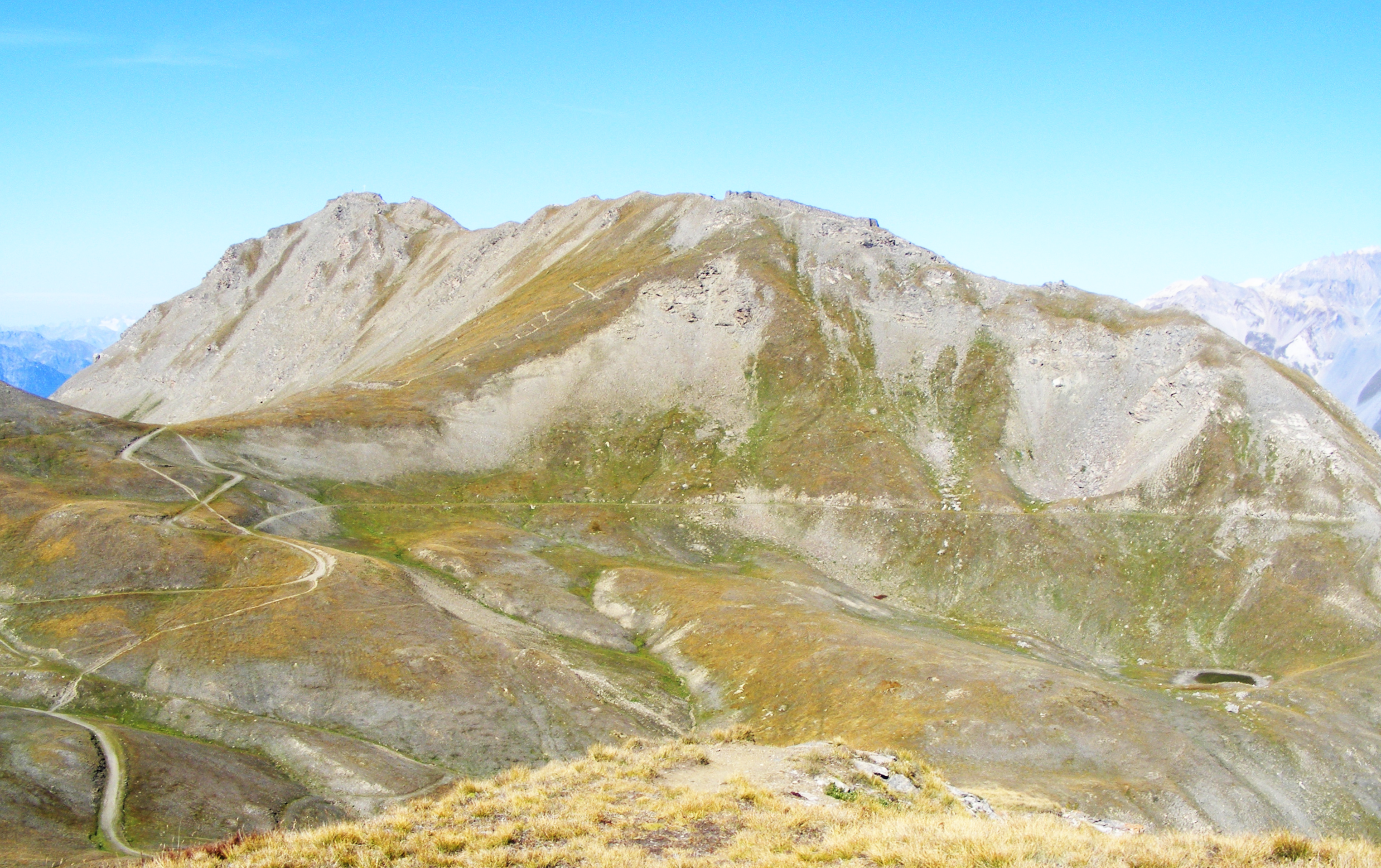
- South face

Highest point
- Elevation: 2,822 m (9,259 ft)
- Prominence: 184 m (604 ft)
- Isolation: 2.47 km (1.53 mi)
- Coordinates: 45°14′15″N 6°50′34″E

Geography
- Location within Alps
- Location: Savoie (France)
- Parent range: Cottian Alps

Climbing
- Easiest route: hiking

The Mont Froid is a 2,822 m high mountain of the northern Cottian Alps.

== Geography ==
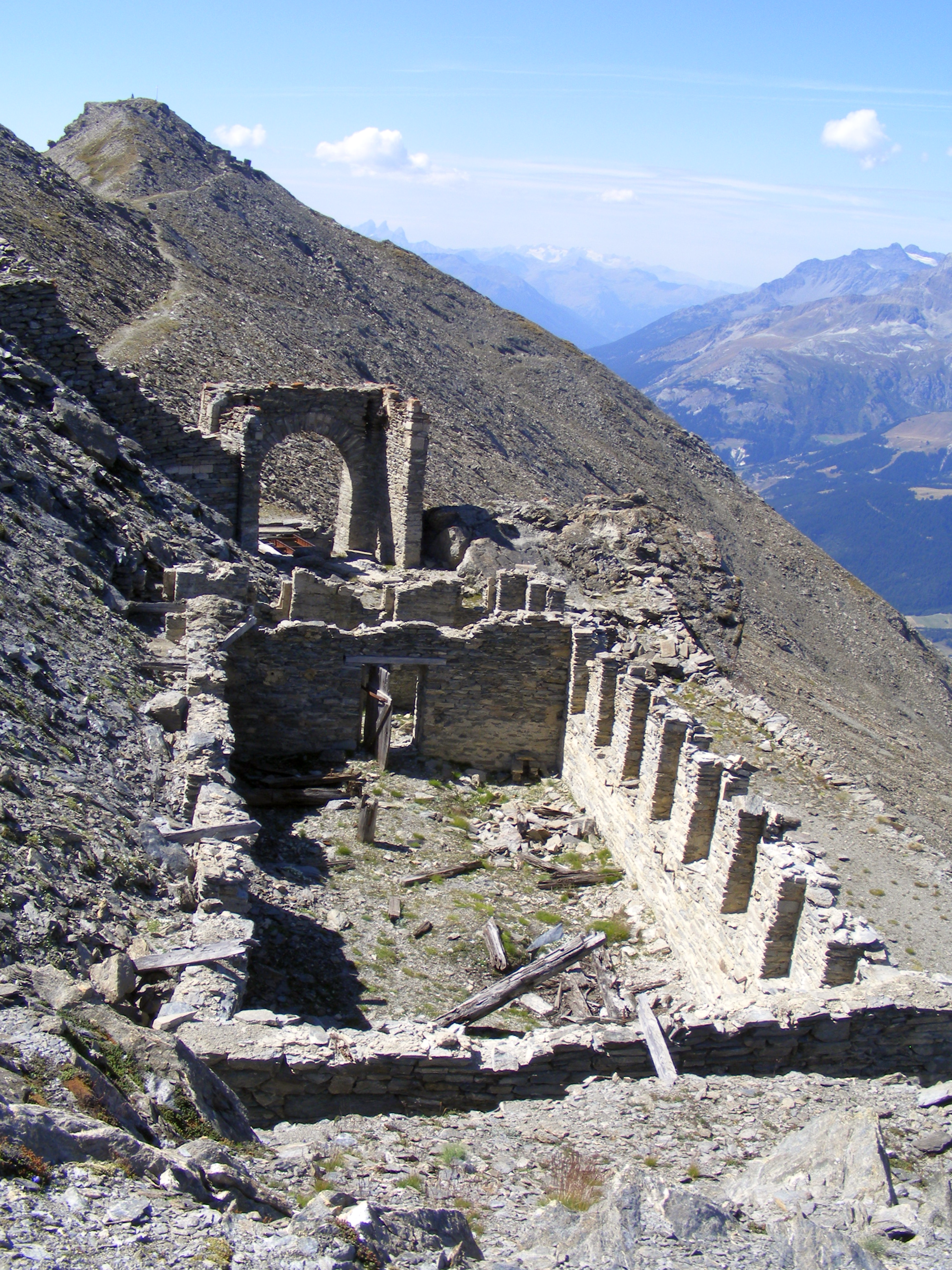
Fort ruins with, in the background, the Moun Froid summit

The mountain is located in the French departement of Savoie (Auvergne-Rhône-Alpes), near the Italian border. It lies close to the main chain of the Alps, to which is connected by a brief ridge starting from a 2,719 metres high minor summit. From there the main ridge follows eastwards with the Col de Sollières (2,639 m) and Signal du Petit Mont-Cenis, while southwards it continues with Col de Bellecombe (2,475 m) and Pointe de Bellecombe.

The Mont Froid, according to the French Alps classification, is part of the Massif des Cerces, while for the SOIUSA (International Standardized Mountain Subdivision of the Alps) it belongs to the Northern Cottian Alps.

== Geology ==
The Mont Froid is mainly made of blackish schists with an underlying basement of gypsum.

== History ==
On the mountain, which thanks to its locations can control a large part of the Moncenisio plateau and Maurienne valley floor, was built at the end of the 19th century a large fortress (Ouvrage du Mont-Froid). The area was later included in the ligne Maginot fortifications, and during the II World War saw some fights facing the chasseurs alpins (French Army) and the German mountain troops.

Nowadays Mont Froid is still used by the French Army for military exercise, mainly in winter, to train mountain troops to high-mountain survival techniques.

== Access to the summit ==
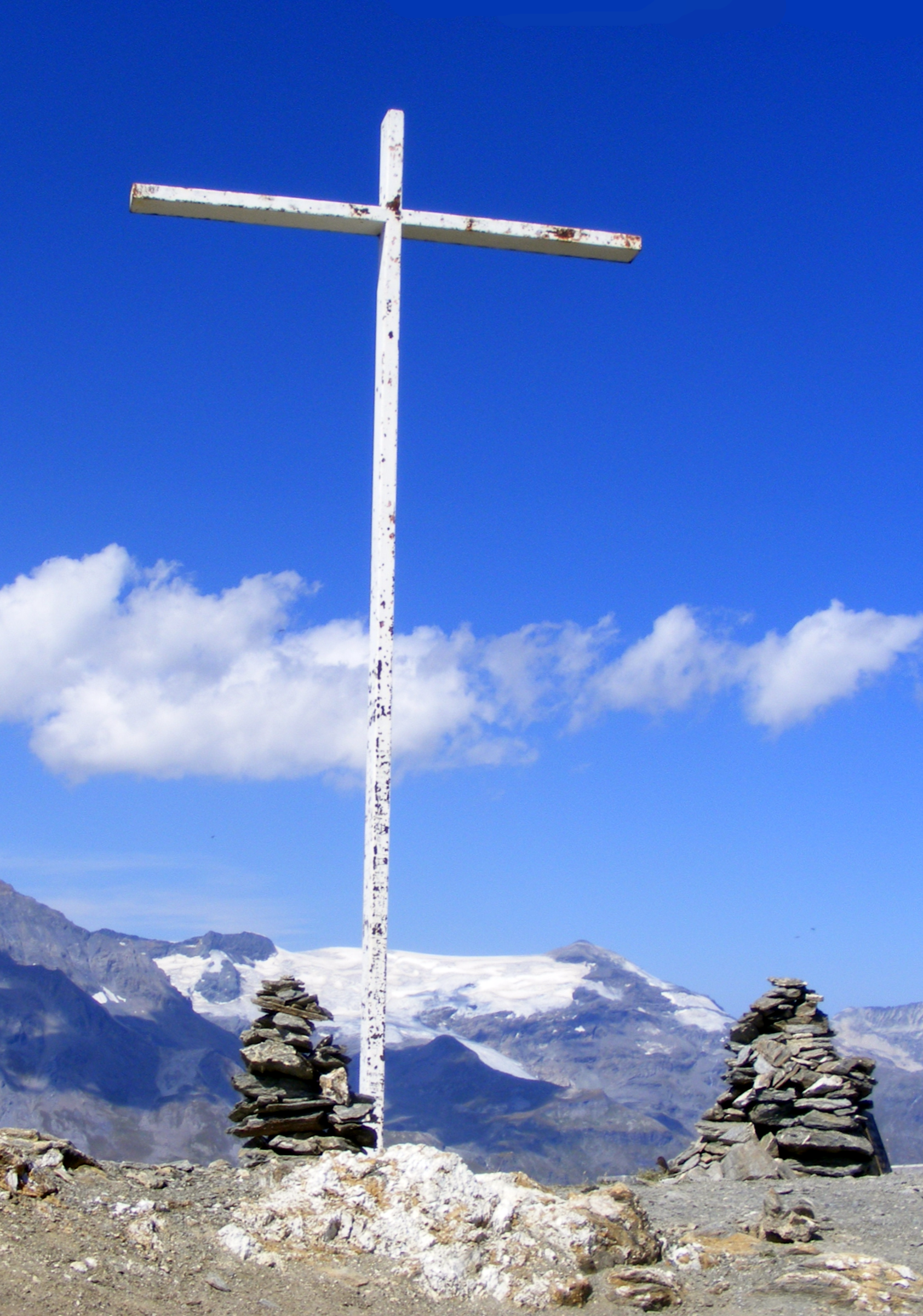
Summit cross

The summit can be reached on foot starting from the refuge du Petit Mont Cenis. The itinerary doesn't require alpinistic skills but some hiking experience and is quite popular among hikers also because its historical interest. The ascent to Mont Froid can be easily combined with the neioghbouring Pointe de Bellecombe.

=== Mountain huts ===
- Refuge du Petit Mont Cenis (2.110 m).

== Bibliography ==
- Aruga, Roberto; Losana, Pietro; Re, Alberto (1985). Alpi Cozie settentrionali. Guida dei Monti d'Italia (in Italian). Milano: CAI / TCI.
- Marazzi, Sergio (2005). Atlante Orografico delle Alpi. SOIUSA (in Italian). Scarmagno: Priuli & Verlucca. ISBN 978-88-8068-273-8.

== Maps ==
- French official cartography (Institut Géographique National - IGN); on-line version: www.geoportail.fr
- Istituto Geografico Centrale – Carta dei sentieri e dei rifugi 1:50.000 nr 2 Valli di Lanzo e Moncenisio
