= Château de la Fauconnière (Vendée) =

Country house in Pays de la Loire, France

Coordinates: 46.1014°N 3.1548°E

The Château de la Fauconnière was a country house in Menomblet, Vendée, Pays de la Loire, France, which burnt down in March 2013.
