= Alain Le Ray =

French general, resistance fighter, first person to escape Colditz POW camp

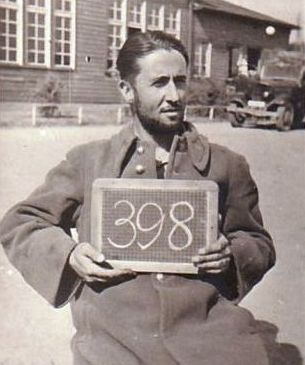
- Le Ray as a prisoner of war in Germany in 1941
- Born: 3 October 1910; Paris, France
- Died: 4 June 2007 (aged 96); Paris, France
- Occupation: Mountaineer
- Spouse: Luce Mauriac

Alain Le Ray (3 October 1910 – 4 June 2007) was a French general and Resistance leader.

Le Ray, a keen alpinist, was a lieutenant in the French mountain infantry when wounded and captured by the Germans in June 1940. After a first escape attempt from a prison camp in occupied Poland, he was transferred to Oflag IV-C. In April 1941, he became the first prisoner ever to escape from the Colditz Castle.

Le Ray returned to France, where he held a position in Vichy Army and was posted at the Uriage Leader's School, under Pierre Dunoyer de Segonzac, a pro-Pétain but anti-German officer. Along with Dunoyer de Segonzac, Le Ray chose Resistance in January 1943. He assumed military command of the maquis du Vercors in February 1943. Le Ray left the Vercors in January 1944 and become the Forces Françaises de l'Intérieur local commanding officer. In this position, he freed Grenoble and fought the still German-occupied alpine forts in 1945.

After the war, Le Ray held senior command in Indochina and Algeria and retired in 1970 as a Corps General.

== Publications ==
- Alain Le Ray, Première à Colditz, Presses Universitaires de Grenoble 2004, ISBN 2706112042
