= Signal du Petit Mont-Cenis =

Mountain in France

- (in Italian) Punta Clairy
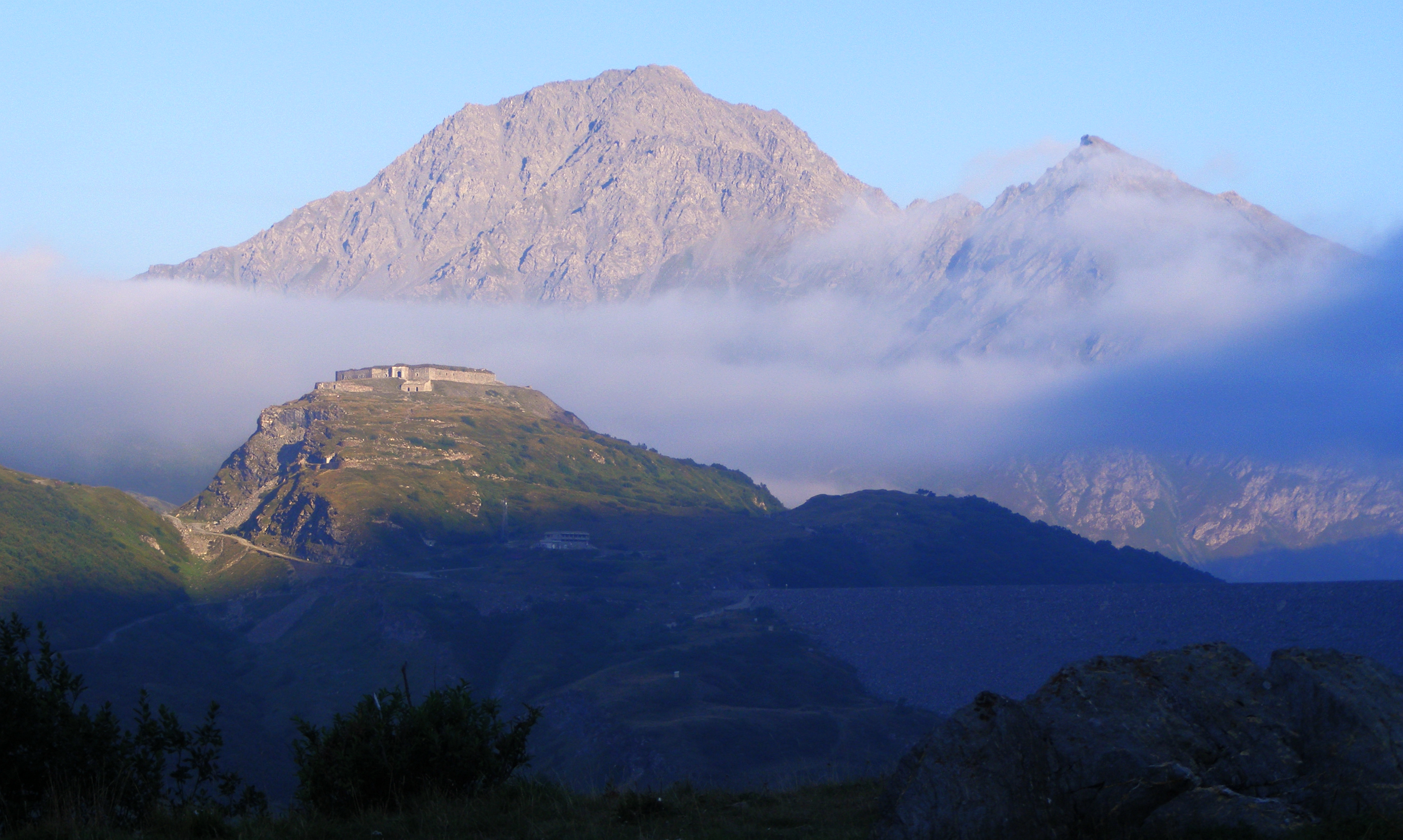

Highest point
- Elevation: 3,162 m (10,374 ft)
- Prominence: 979 m (3,212 ft)
- Listing: Alpine mountains above 3000 m
- Coordinates: 45°14′39″N 6°52′22″E

Geography
- Location within Alps
- Location: Savoie (France)
- Parent range: Cottian Alps

The Signal du Petit Mont-Cenis (in Italian Punta Clairy) is a 3,162 m high mountain of the Cottian Alps.

== Geography ==
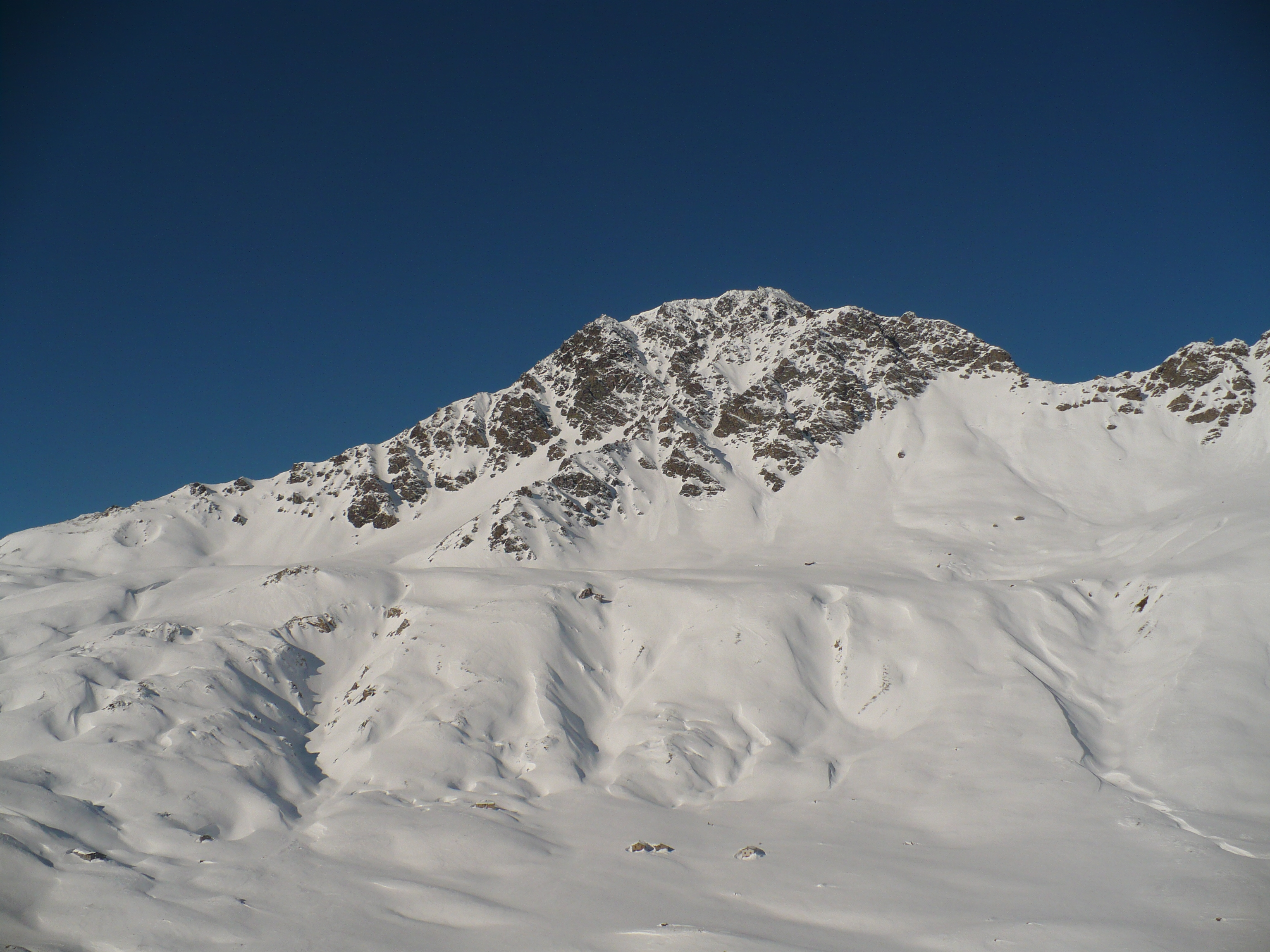
The mountain in wintertime

The mountain is located in the French departement of Savoie (Auvergne-Rhône-Alpes), near the Italian border. It visually dominates the west side of the Mont Cenis lake and belongs to the main chain of the Alps, standing on the water divide between the watersheds of the Dora Riparia (Po Valley) and of the Arc (Rhone Valley). It lies between the pass of Mont Cenis and the Col du Petit Mont-Cenis (2,183 m).

== History ==
The mountain, although lying on the Alpine watershed between the Val di Susa and the Maurienne, is entirely in French territory following the boundary adjustments decided in the 1947 Treaty of Paris. The area was interested by the Vallo Alpino and ligne Maginot fortifications and then saw heavy fights during the II World War, facing in 1945 the chasseurs alpins (French Army) and German mountain troops.

== Access to the summit ==
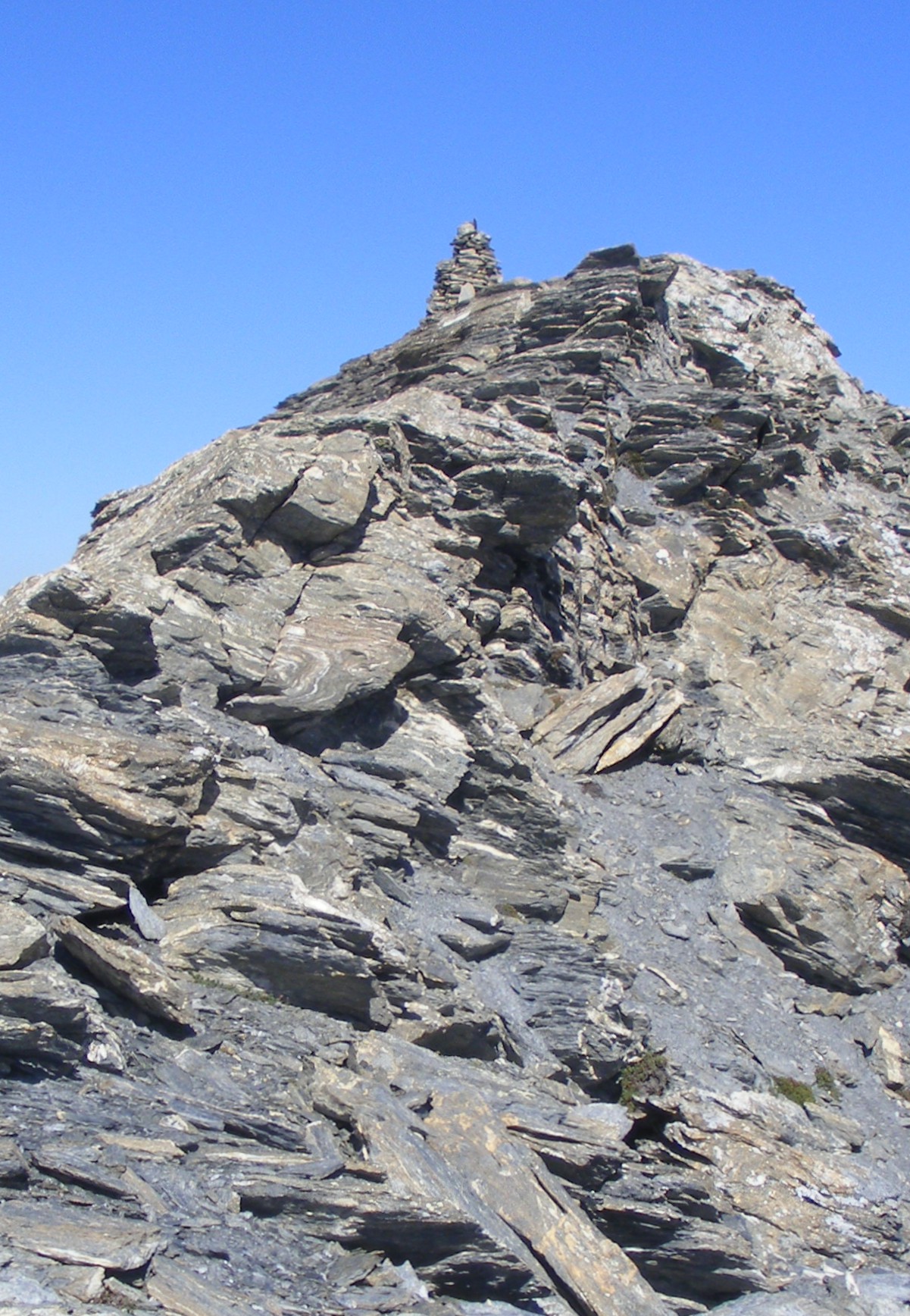
Summit cairn

The summit can be reached on foot starting from the refuge du Petit Mont Cenis with some scrambling, in about 3 hours' walk.

== Maps ==
- French official cartography (Institut géographique national - IGN); on-line version: www.geoportail.fr
- Istituto Geografico Centrale - Carta dei sentieri e dei rifugi 1:50.000 nr 2 Valli di Lanzo e Moncenisio
