= Cabanac-et-Villagrains =

- Commune
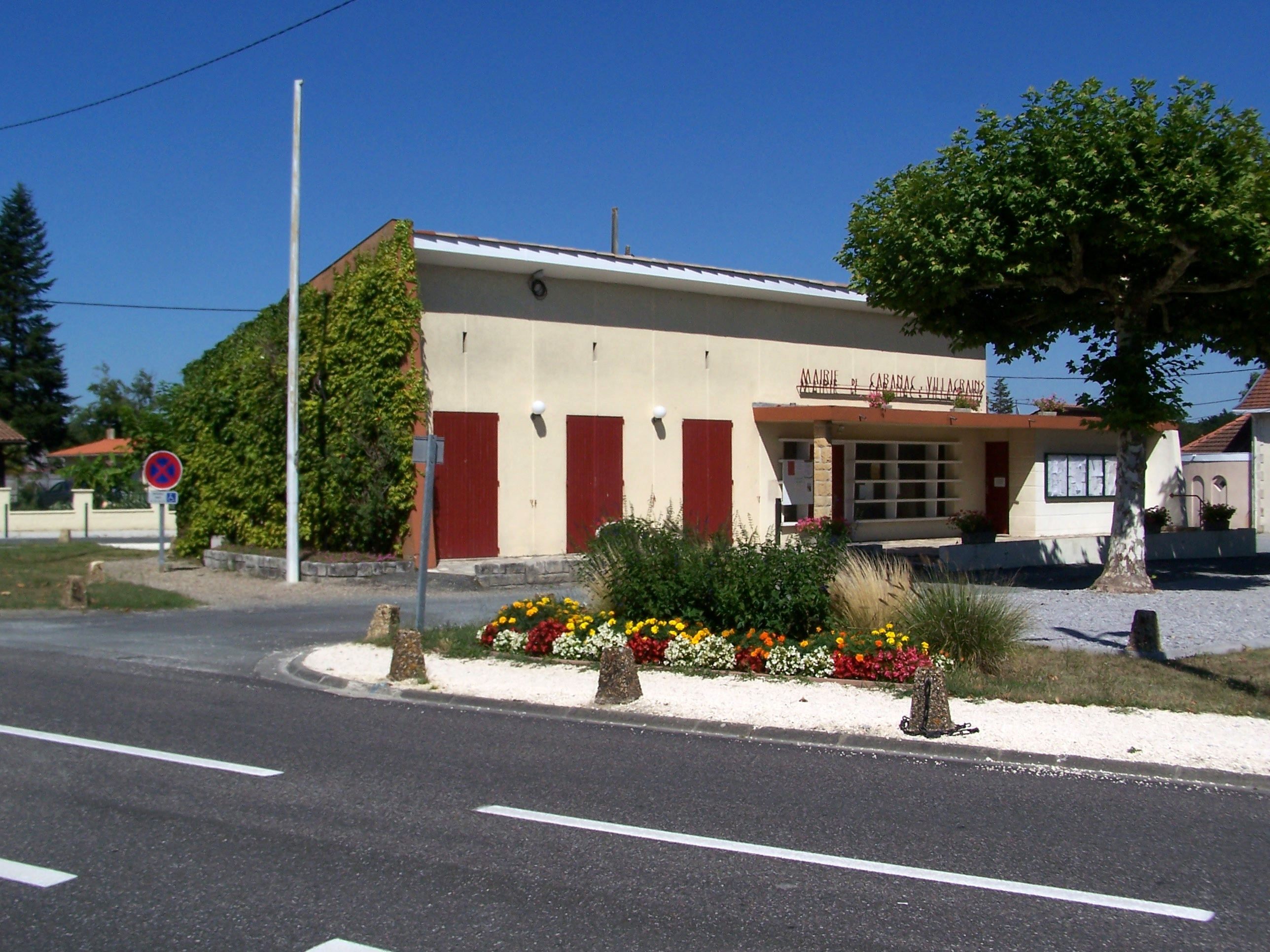
- The town hall in Cabanac-et-Villagrains

- Coat of arms
- Location of Cabanac-et-Villagrains
- Location within France Location within Nouvelle-Aquitaine
- Coordinates: 44°36′26″N 0°33′08″W
- Country: France
- Region: Nouvelle-Aquitaine
- Department: Gironde
- Arrondissement: Bordeaux
- Canton: La Brède
- Intercommunality: Montesquieu

Government
  - Mayor (2023–2026): Jean-Georges Clair
- Area^{1}: 69 km^{2} (27 sq mi)
- Elevation: 48 m (157 ft)
- Highest elevation: 77 m (253 ft)
- Lowest elevation: 22 m (72 ft)
- Population (2023): 2,400
  - Density: 35/km^{2} (90/sq mi)
- Time zone: UTC+01:00 (CET)
  - Summer (DST): UTC+02:00 (CEST)
- INSEE/Postal code: 33077 /33650
- ^{1} French Land Register data, which excludes lakes, ponds, glaciers > 1 km^{2} (0.386 sq mi or 247 acres) and river estuaries.

Cabanac-et-Villagrains (French pronunciation: [kabanak e vilaɡʁɛ̃s]; Gascon: Cabanac e Vilagrans) is a commune in the Gironde department in Nouvelle-Aquitaine in southwestern France.

== Population ==
Historical population
Year	Pop.	±% p.a.
1968	895	—
1975	808	−1.45%
1982	930	+2.03%
1990	1,123	+2.39%
1999	1,437	+2.78%
2007	2,051	+4.55%
2012	2,159	+1.03%
2017	2,393	+2.08%
2023	2,400	+0.05%
Source: INSEE

== See also ==
- Communes of the Gironde department
