= Château d'Uriage =

Coordinates: 45.1446°N 5.8325°E

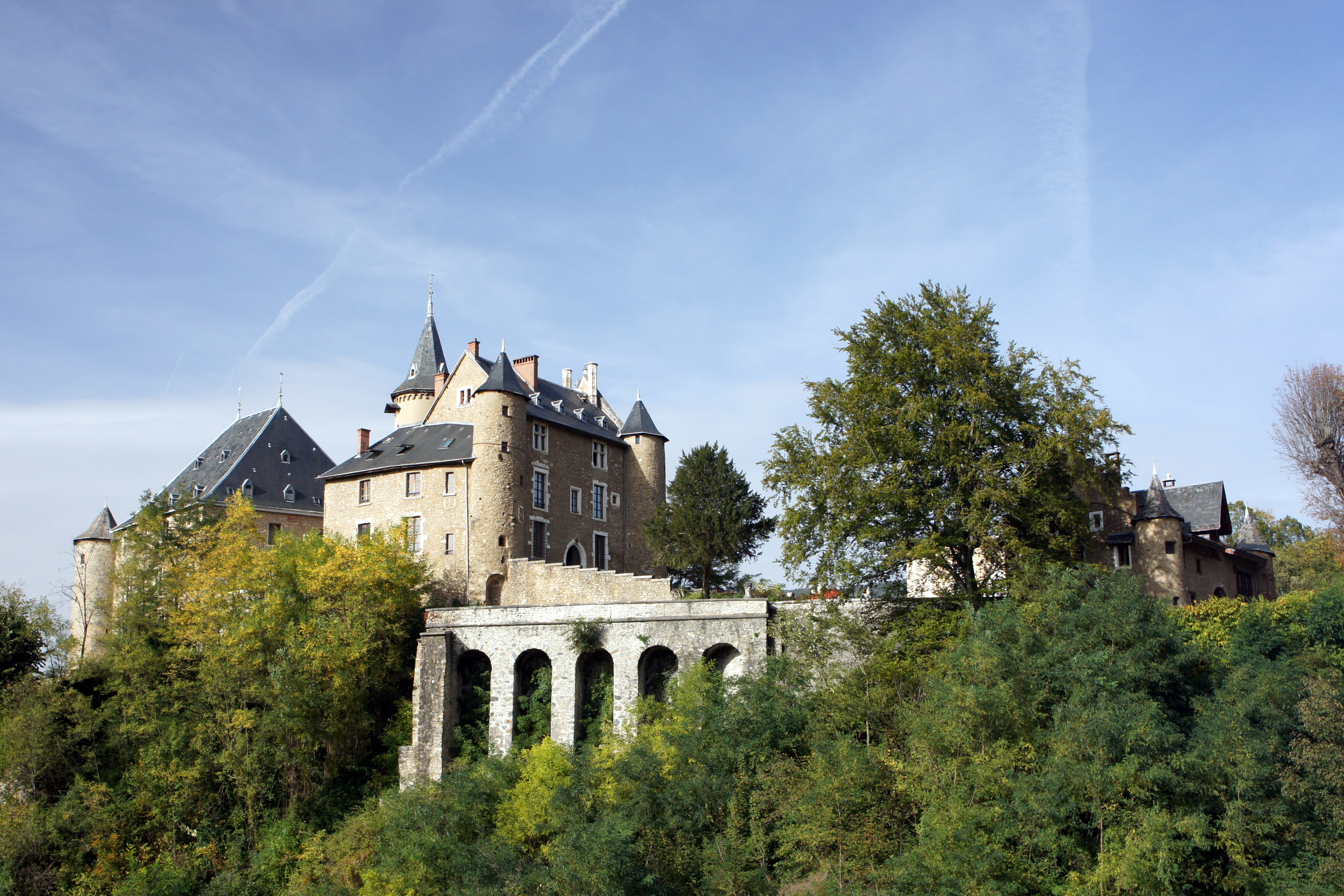
- Château d'Uriage in 2012
- Interactive map of the Château d'Uriage area

General information
- Location: France

Website
- https://chateauduriage.wordpress.com/

The Château d'Uriage is an historic castle in Saint-Martin-d'Uriage, Isère, Rhône-Alpes, France.

== History ==
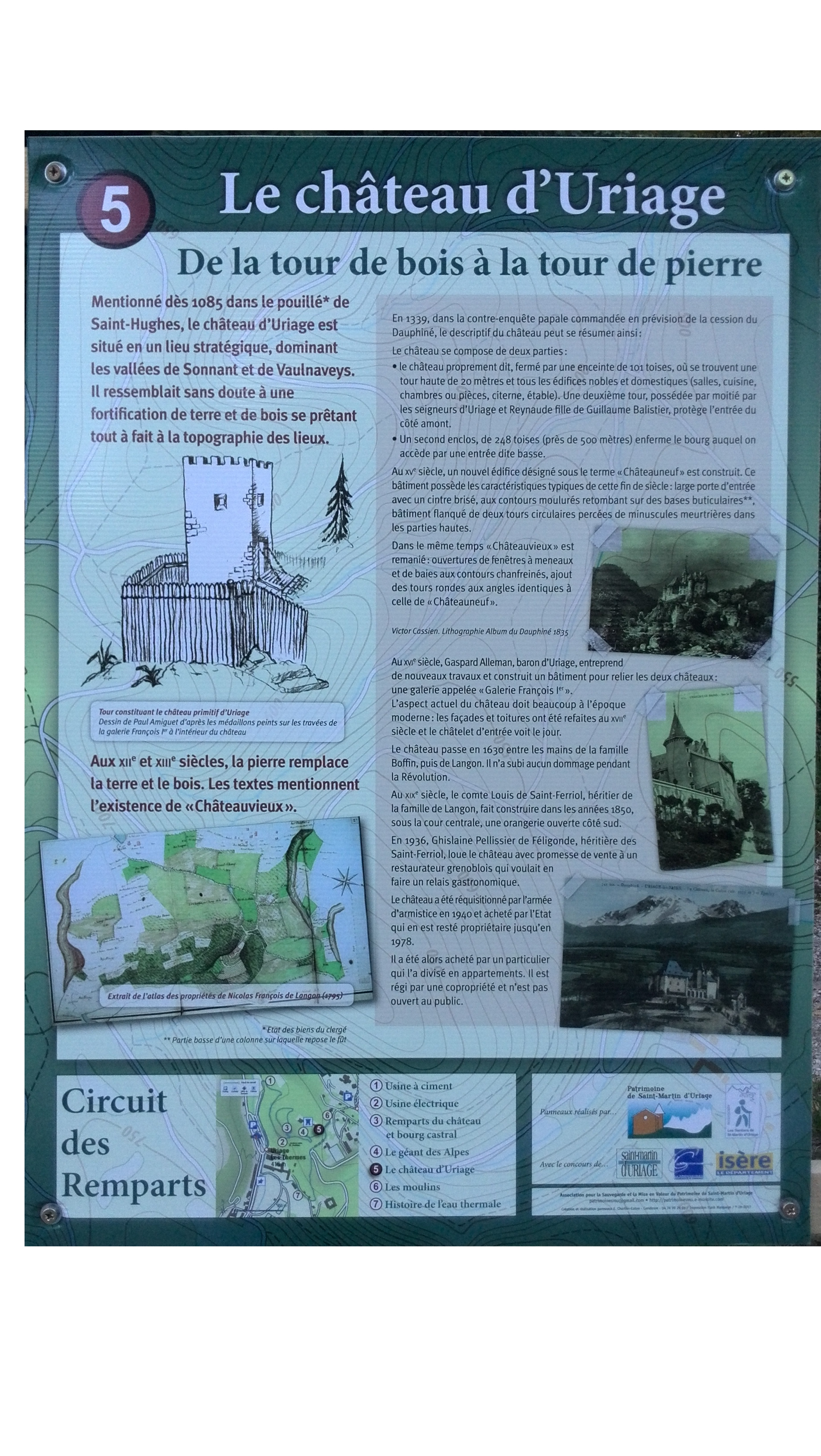
Plaque at Château d'Uriage

The castle was built at the end of the 10th century, then transformed during the 15th and 16th centuries.

From summer 1940 to December 1942, the château was home to the Ecole Nationale des Cadres de la Jeunesse, a training school for the French elite inspired by the Revolution nationale heralded by Marshal Philippe Pétain.

In the late 1980s, it was transformed into a co-ownership of 50 flats, making it a private property. Following a vote from the co-owners, the castle grounds are open to the public one or two days a year, on the European Heritage Days.

== Architectural significance ==
It has been listed as an official monument since 1990.
