= Hans Schlemmer =

German World War II General

Johann Schlemmer
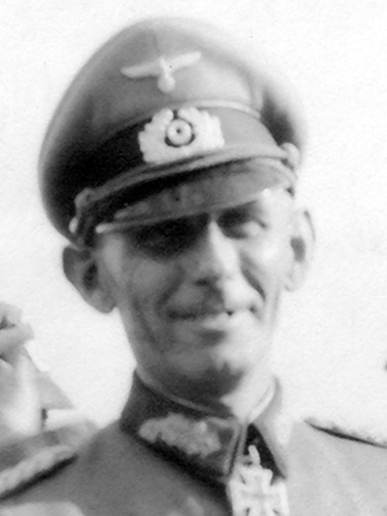
- Schlemmer, c. 1941-1944
- Born: 18 January 1893
- Died: 26 June 1973 (aged 80)
- Military career
- Allegiance: German Empire; Weimar Republic; Nazi Germany
- Branch: German Army
- Service years: 1913–1945
- Rank: General der Gebirgstruppe
- Commands: 134th Infantry Division; LXXV Army Corps
- Conflicts: World War I; World War II; Invasion of Poland; Battle of France; Operation Barbarossa; Battle of Moscow; Battle of Kursk; Italian Campaign; Gothic Line Offensive
- Awards: Knight's Cross of the Iron Cross with Oak Leaves

Signature
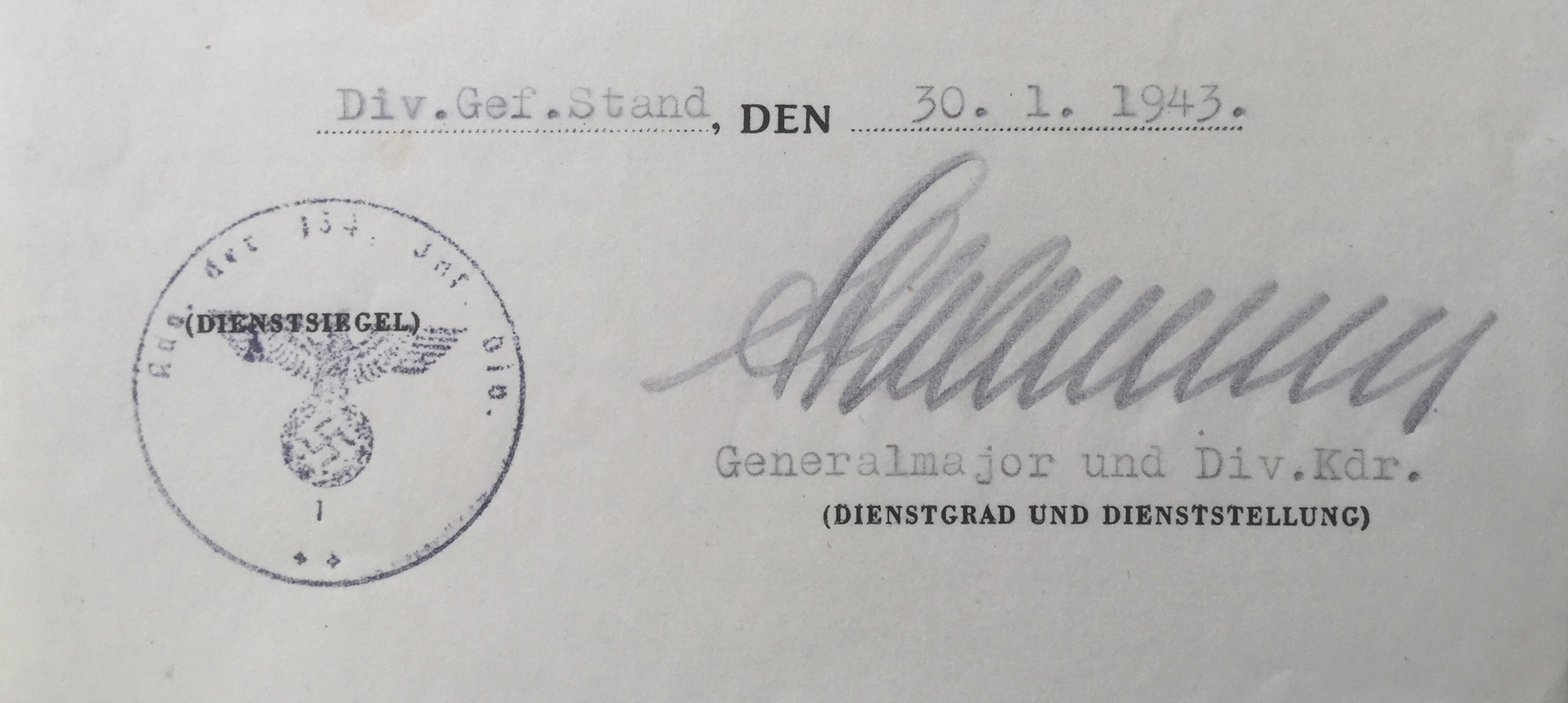

Johann Schlemmer (18 January 1893 – 26 June 1973) was a German general during World War II who commanded the LXXV Army Corps. He was a recipient of the Knight's Cross of the Iron Cross with Oak Leaves. Schlemmer surrendered to Allied troops in Italy in 1945.

== Life and career ==
Johann Schlemmer was born in Nesselwang in Bavaria on 18 January 1893. Joining the German Army in 1913, he served in World War I as a lieutenant in the Bavarian Artillery. He remained in the army after 1918. At the outbreak of World War II he commanded first a battalion, then a regiment, of mountain artillery, before being promoted to general officer rank, commanding the 134th Infantry Division.

He ended the war as a General of Mountain Troops, commanding the LXXV Army Corps in Italy. He surrendered to Allied troops in Italy in 1945.

== Awards and decorations ==
- Iron Cross (1914) 2nd Class (9 November 1914) & 1st Class (17 December 1916)
- Clasp to the Iron Cross (1939) 2nd Class (2 October 1939) & 1st Class (25 May 1940)
- German Cross in Gold on 23 January 1942 as Oberst (Colonel) in the 134th Infantry Division
- Knight's Cross of the Iron Cross with Oak Leaves
  - Knight's Cross on 21 April 1942 as Generalmajor and commander of 134th Infantry Division
  - 369th Oak Leaves on 18 January 1944 as Generalleutnant and commander of 134th Infantry Division

Military offices
Preceded by Generalleutnant Conrad von Cochenhausen	Commander of 134. Infanterie-Division; 12 December 1941 – February 1944	Succeeded by Generalmajor Rudolf Bader
Preceded by General der Infanterie Anton Dostler	Commander of LXXV Army Corps; 2 July 1944 – 8 May 1945	Succeeded by none
