= Tito Agosti =

Italian soldier

- Born: 19 August 1889; Morrovalle, Kingdom of Italy
- Died: 27 January 1946 (aged 56); Rome, Kingdom of Italy
- Military career
- Allegiance: Kingdom of Italy; Italian Social Republic
- Branch: Royal Italian Army; National Republican Army
- Service years: 1912–1945
- Rank: Major General
- Commands: "Penne di Falco" Colonial Cavalry Squadron Group; III Somalian Armed Band Group; 2nd Grenadiers Division "Littorio"
- Conflicts: Italo-Turkish War; World War I: Battle of Vittorio Veneto; Second Italo-Ethiopian War; World War II: East African campaign; Gothic Line; Second Battle of the Alps
- Awards: Silver Medal of Military Valour (three times); Bronze Medal of Military Valour; Military Order of Savoy; Order of the Crown of Italy

Tito Agosti (Morrovalle, 19 August 1889 – Rome, 27 January 1946) was an officer in the Royal Italian Army during the Italo-Turkish War, World War I, the Second Italo-Ethiopian War and World War II, and a general in the Army of the Italian Social Republic.

== Biography ==
He was born in Morrovalle, Marche, on 19 August 1889, the son of Felice Agosti and Palmira Garzoglio, and enlisted in the Royal Italian Army at a young age, becoming a second lieutenant on 19 May 1912. He briefly participated in the Italo-Turkish War, fighting in Libya, and then in the First World War, in which he was promoted to the rank of captain on August 23, 1917, and awarded a Silver Medal of Military Valour for his behaviour during the battle of Vittorio Veneto.

In 1925–1926, with the rank of captain, he commanded a company of the 13th Eritrean Battalion, participating in the pacification of Jubaland and the Majerteen Sultanate in Somalia. During the 1920s he joined the National Fascist Party, and in 1935–1936 he participated in the Second Italo-Ethiopian War, first commanding the "Penne di Falco" Colonial Cavalry Squadron Group and then the III Somalian Armed Band Group on the Harar front, earning a Bronze Medal of Military Valour and two promotions for war merit, to lieutenant colonel on 31 December 1935 and then to colonel. At the end of the war he was awarded another Silver Medal of Military Valor.

After the outbreak of World War II he fought in Italian East Africa, where he was tasked with the defense of Shahmanna, in the southern front of Galla-Sidamo; after the bloody battle of the Dadaba he managed to withdraw his surviving troops, repelling continuous attacks from thousands of Arsi guerrillas. On 19 May 1941 he was seriously wounded and captured by the British after having fought "to the limit of human possibilities" as ordered by the Supreme Command, and was awarded the Knight's Cross of the Military Order of Savoy on 1 August 1941, and subsequently a third Silver medal of military valor.

He was repatriated in an exchange of wounded prisoners, and on 18 September 1943, after the Armistice of Cassibile, he joined the Italian Social Republic with the rank of cavalry Major General. He was given command of the 2nd Grenadiers Division "Littorio", one of the four field divisions of the National Republican Army, then training in Germany in Münsingen. After returning to Italy, the division was initially deployed near the Gothic Line, but was later transferred to the Western Alps, at the border with France, where it fought French and American troops in the Second Battle of the Alps. On 27 April 1945 Agosti dissolved the division, and was then captured by the Allies. He was initially imprisoned in the Coltano POW camp and later in the military prison of Forte Boccea in Rome. In 1946 he committed suicide in prison while awaiting trial for war crimes, refusing to be judged by a jury that he considered as composed of "traitors".
