= Pierre Dunoyer de Segonzac =

French Resistance and Brigade general

Pierre Dunoyer de Segonzac (10 March 1906 – 13 March 1968) was a French Resistance and Brigade General.

== Biography ==
Pierre Dominique Dunoyer de Segonzac was born on March 10, 1908, in Toulon. He was the son of Charles Dunoyer de Segonzac, naval officer, and Adèle Desvaux. As a child he lived in the various maritime bases in which his father was stationed: mainly Toulon and Lorient. During the war of 1914–1918 he spent a few years in Saint-Léonard-de-Noblat, in the Limousin, where his mother settled, while his father was engaged in the Atlantic then in the Mediterranean and France. black Sea.

At the beginning of the war of 1939–1945, at the head of his squadron of tanks of the 4th regiment of cuirassiers, he fought near a Quesnoy a regiment of panzers supported by a regiment of riflemen, and fights until the armistice. He then becomes the director of the School of the cadres of Uriage, which he creates immediately after the defeat of 1940 with the support of the secretariat to the Youth of the Vichy regime. Resisting the multiple pressures exerted by the regime, Dunoyer de Segonzac spares his school a great autonomy which allows him to make of it a place of reflection, a breeding ground of the Resistance.

At the closing of the school by the Laval government at the end of 1942, he went into hiding and his team spread in many maquis (the Vercors, the Paris region, Brittany, the North ...). At the beginning of February 1943, he made contact with Captain Pommiès while he was in Toulouse for the development of an intelligence and counterintelligence service1. Subsequently, he himself took command of the French Forces Interior (FFI) Zone A Tarn with which it frees the cities of the region (Castres, Mazamet, Béziers). Constituting his troops in regiment (the 12th Dragons), he took Autun, entered Nevers to join with the 1st Army of General de Lattre. He enters Germany after very hard fighting in the Vosges.

He was appointed Brigadier General in 1959.

== Publications ==
Pierre Dunoyer de Segonzac, Reflections for Young Leaders, National School of Managers, 1941, 34 p. Pierre Dunoyer de Segonzac, The Old Leader: Memoirs and Selected Pages, Paris, Seuil Publishing, 1971, 251 p.

== Decorations ==
- Commandeur de la Légion d'honneur (1956)
- Croix de guerre 1939-1945
- Médaille de la Résistance
