= 2nd Grenadier Division "Littorio" =

One of four divisions raised by Mussolini's Italian Social Republic

- 2ª Divisione Granatieri "Littorio"
- Active: 1 January 1944 - 28 April 1945
- Country: Italian Social Republic
- Branch: National Republican Army
- Engagements: World War II: Italian campaign; Gothic Line; Second Battle of the Alps

Commanders
- Notable commanders: Tito Agosti

The 2nd Grenadier Division "Littorio" (Italian: 2ª Divisione granatieri "Littorio") was one of four divisions raised by Mussolini's Italian Social Republic. Although an infantry formation, it was referred to as a "Grenadier" formation to connect it with preceding Granatieri di Sardegna units.

== History ==
The 18,500 men strong Division was formed from Italian POW's in Germany and new conscripts from Northern Italy. It was trained in Germany and was ready for combat at the end of October 1944. One month later the Littorio Division was deployed in Italy, close to Gothic Line. In January 1945 the Littorio Division was transferred to the Piedmont Alps, where it fought against French regular and partisan forces in the Second Battle of the Alps until the end of the war. Western Alps defence was entrusted to the LXXV German Army Corps to whom were added the main part of the Monterosa, the Littorio Division and other units (Decima Flottiglia MAS, Cacciatori delle Alpi). The Littorio successfully defended the Italian frontier preventing the French from invading Aosta Valley. The last battalions of the Littorio surrendered to the Allies on 4 May 1945, two days after the surrender of German and Italian Republican forces in Italy.

== Organization ==
2nd Grenadier Division "Littorio": Maj. Gen. Tito Agosti

- Division Headquarters
- Divisional Troops
  - 2nd Reconnaissance Battalion
  - 2nd Anti-tank Company (motorized 88mm/L71 guns)
  - 2nd Mountain Assault Engineer Battalion
  - 2nd Signal Battalion
  - 2nd Transport Battalion
  - 102nd Replacement Battalion "Littorio"
  - Scuola d’Alpinismo e Sci ("Mountaineering and Skiing Military School")
  - 2nd Military Police Section
  - Deutsches Verbindungskommando 181 ("German Liaison Unit")
- 3rd Grenadier Regiment
  - HQ Company
  - Light Column
  - I Infantry Battalion
  - II Infantry Battalion
  - III Infantry Battalion
  - 103rd Cacciatori Carri ("Tank Hunters") Company
- 4th Alpini Regiment
  - HQ Company
  - Light Column
  - Alpini Battalion "Varese"
  - Alpini Battalion "Bergamo"
  - Alpini Battalion "Edolo"
  - 104th Cacciatori Carri ("Tank Hunters") Company
- 2nd Artillery Regiment
  - I Group with horse-drawn 100mm field guns.
  - III Groups with 65mm mountain guns transported by pack mules.

== War crimes ==
The division has been implicated in nineteen instances of war crimes in Italy between November 1944 and May 1945, with around 120 civilians killed in the course of these incidents.

== See also ==
- Benito Mussolini
- Repubblica Sociale Italiana (Italian Social Republic) [1943-1945]
- Esercito Nazionale Repubblicano (Republican National Army)
