= Pointe de Bellecombe =

Mountain in France

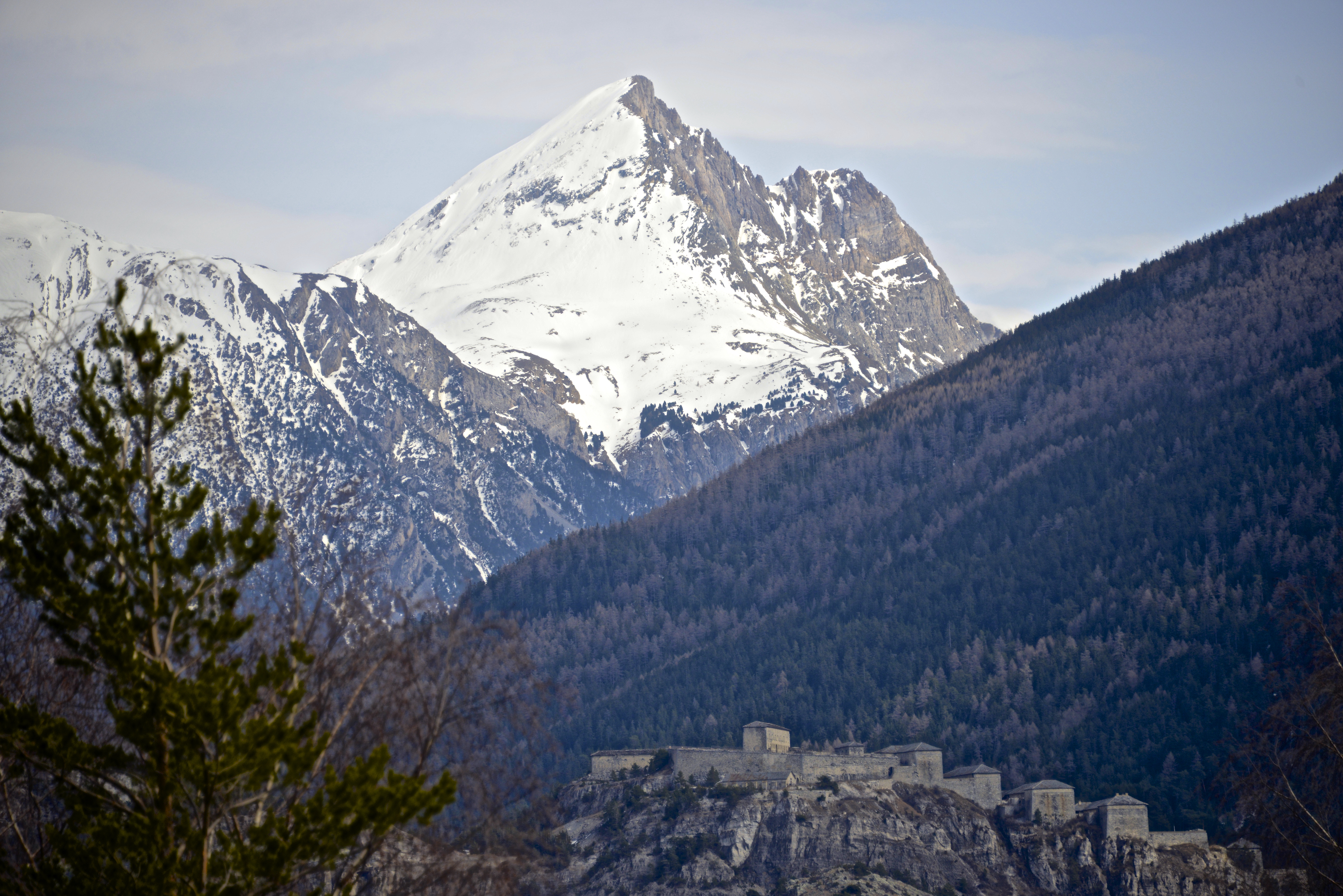

Highest point
- Elevation: 2,775 m (9,104 ft)
- Prominence: 280 m (920 ft)
- Coordinates: 45°13′03″N 6°50′53″E

Geography
- Location within Alps
- Location: Savoie (France)
- Parent range: Cottian Alps

Climbing
- Easiest route: hiking

The Pointe de Bellecombe is a 2,775 m high mountain of the northern Cottian Alps.

== Geography ==
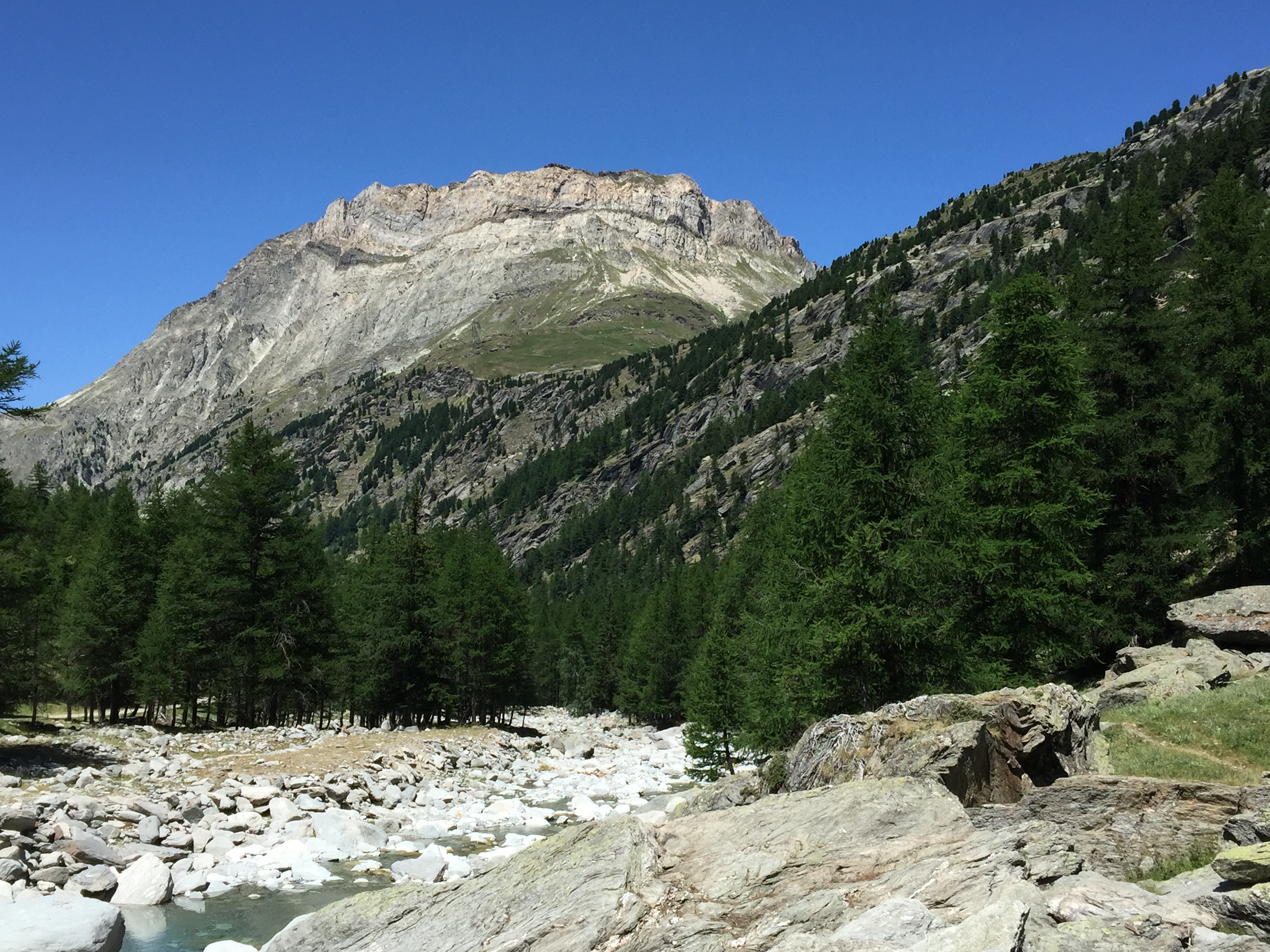
The mountain from the Ambin Valley

The mountain is located in the French departement of Savoie (Auvergne-Rhône-Alpes), near the Italian border. It belongs to the main chain of the Alps and stands on the water divide between the watersheds of the Dora Riparia (Po Valley) and of the Arc (Rhone Valley). It lies between the Col du Petit Mont-Cenis (2,183 m) and the Col de Bellecombe (2,475 m).

== History ==
The mountain, although lying on the Alpine watershed between the Val di Susa and the Maurienne, is entirely in French territory following the boundary adjustments decided in the 1947 Treaty of Paris. The area was interested in the Vallo Alpino and ligne Maginot fortifications and then during the II World War saw the fights facing the chasseurs alpins (French Army) and the German mountain troops.

== Access to the summit ==
The summit can be reached on foot starting from the refuge du Petit Mont Cenis (at 2,095 m). The itinerary doesn't require alpinistic skills but some hiking experience.

== Maps ==
- French official cartography (Institut géographique national - IGN); on-line version: www.geoportail.fr
- Istituto Geografico Centrale - Carta dei sentieri e dei rifugi 1:50.000 nr 2 Valli di Lanzo e Moncenisio
