= 114th Jäger Division =

714th Infantry Division 114th Jäger Division
- German: 714. Infanterie-Division; 114. Jäger-Division
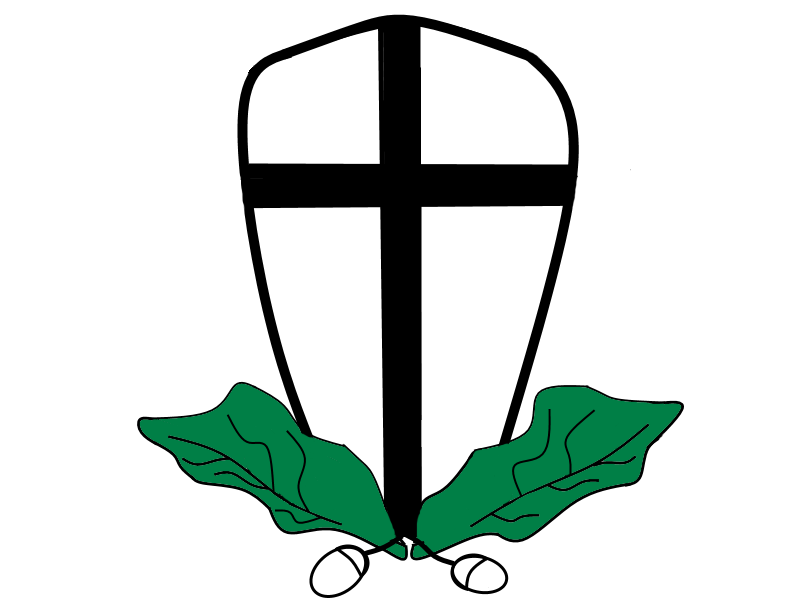
- 114. Jäger Division Vehicle Insignia
- Active: 1941–April 1945
- Country: Nazi Germany
- Branch: Heer (Wehrmacht)
- Type: Infantry (1941-1943); Jäger (1943-1945)
- Role: Light Infantry
- Size: Division
- Engagements: World War II: Battle of Kozara; Operation Ziethen; Operation Delphin; Battle of Anzio; Operation Encore

114th Jäger Division (German: 114. Jäger-Division) was a light infantry division of the German Army in World War II. It was formed in April 1943, following the reorganization and redesignation of the 714th Infantry Division (German: 714. Infanterie-Division). The 714th Division had been formed in May 1941, and transferred to Yugoslavia to conduct anti-partisan and Internal security operations. It was involved in Operation Delphin which was an anti-partisan operation in Croatia that took place between 15 November and 1 December 1943. The objective of the mission was to destroy the Partisan elements on the Dalmatian islands off central Dalmatia.

The division was transferred to Italy in January 1944, to reinforce the Anzio front. It was deployed against the US 10th Mountain Division during Operation Encore, where by April 1945 it was destroyed.

== Background ==
The main purpose of the German jäger divisions was to fight in adverse terrain where smaller, coordinated formations were more facilely combat capable than the brute force offered by the standard infantry divisions. The jäger divisions were more heavily equipped than mountain divisions, but not as well armed as a larger infantry formation. In the early stages of the war, they were the interface divisions fighting in rough terrain and foothills as well as urban areas, between the mountains and the plains. The jägers (it means hunters in German), relied on a high degree of training and slightly superior communications, as well as their not inconsiderable artillery support. In the middle stages of the war, as the standard infantry divisions were downsized, the Jäger structure of divisions with two infantry regiments, became the standard table of organization.

== Alleged war crimes ==
The 114th Jäger Division was implicated in a war crime in the village of Filetto di Camarda, when seventeen men were shot in retaliation for the killing of four German soldiers on 7 June 1944 and parts of the village were burned down. The officer in command at the time was Matthias Defregger, who became a bishop in Munich after the war and was forced to resign when investigations of the killing were reopened in 1969.

The division has been implicated in the Madonna dell'Albero massacre, Emilia-Romagna, on 27 November 1944, when 56 civilians were executed.

The division also took part in the shooting of forty civilians in Gubbio on 22 June 1944, in reprisal for a partisan attack on two officers, one of whom was killed, the other wounded.

This formation was one of those singled out in exhibit UK-66, the British report on German reprisals for Partisan activities in Italy at the International Military Tribunal war crimes trial in Nuremberg:

Evidence has been found to show that a large number of the atrocities in Italy were committed by the Fallschirm-Panzer Division 1 Hermann Göring, 1st Parachute Division, 16th SS Panzergrenadier Division and the 114th Jäger Division.

== Commanders ==
- Generalleutnant Friedrich Stahl (2 May 1941 – 31 December 1942)
- Generalleutnant Josef Reichert (1 January 1943 – 20 February 1943)
- General der Gebirgstruppe Karl Eglseer (20 February 1943 – 1 December 1943)
- Generalleutnant Alexander Bourquin (1 December 1943 – 19 May 1944)
- Generalleutnant Dr. Hans Boelsen (19 May 1944 – 19 July 1944)
- Generalmajor Hans-Joachim Ehlert (19 July 1944 – 15 April 1945)
- Generalmajor Martin Strahammer (15 April 1945 – 23 April 1945)

== Area of operations ==
- Germany (May 1941 – May 1941)
- Serbia and Independent State of Croatia (May 1941 – April 1943)
- Yugoslavia (April 1943 – January 1944)
- Italy (January 1944 – April 1945)

== Order of battle ==
- Jäger Regiment 721
- Jäger Regiment 741
- Reconnaissance Battalion 114
- Artillery Regiment 661
- Pionier Battalion 114
- Panzerjäger Battalion 114
- Signals Battalion 114
- Reserve Battalion 114
- Supply detachment 114

== Sources ==
- Hoyt, Edwin Palmer (2002). Backwater War: the Allied Campaign in Italy, 1943–1945. Greenwood Publishing Group. ISBN 978-0-275-97478-7.
- Günther, Matthias. "Die 114. Jäger-Division (714. ID). Partisanenbekämpfung und Geiselerschießungen der Wehrmacht auf dem Balkan und in Italien." Quellen und Forschungen in italienischen Archiven und Bibliotheken, 85, 2005, pp. 395–424 (PDF)
- Shepherd, Ben (2012). Terror in the Balkans: German Armies and Partisan Warfare. Harvard University Press. ISBN 978-0-674-04891-1.
