= Reinhard Marx =

German Roman Catholic cardinal (born 1953)

His Eminence Reinhard Marx
- Cardinal, Archbishop of Munich and Freising
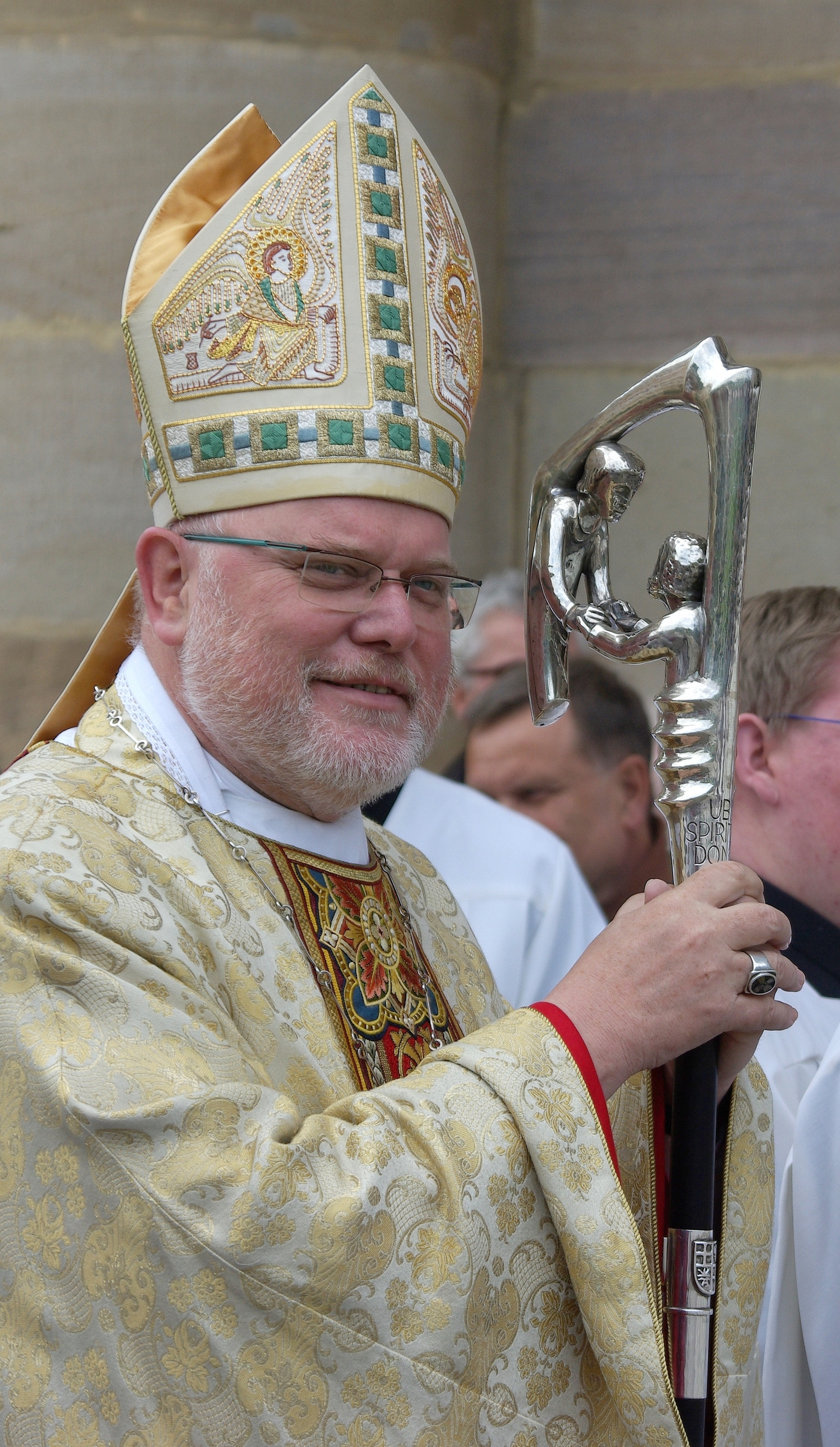
- Marx in 2009
- Church: Latin Church
- Archdiocese: Munich and Freising
- Appointed: 30 November 2007
- Installed: 2 February 2008
- Predecessor: Friedrich Wetter
- Other posts: Cardinal-Priest of S. Corbiniano; President of the Commission of the Bishops' Conferences of the European Community; Coordinator of Council for the Economy; Member of the Council of Cardinals
- Previous posts: Auxiliary Bishop of Paderborn (1996–2001); Titular Bishop of Petina (1996–2001); Bishop of Trier (2001–2007); President of German Bishops' Conference

Orders
- Ordination: 2 June 1979 by Johannes Joachim Degenhardt
- Consecration: 21 September 1996 by Johannes Joachim Degenhardt
- Created cardinal: 20 November 2010 by Benedict XVI
- Rank: Cardinal-Priest

Personal details
- Born: Reinhard Marx; 21 September 1953 (age 73) Geseke, West Germany
- Denomination: Catholic Church
- Motto: Ubi Spiritus Domini Ibi Libertas; Where the Spirit of the Lord is, there is Freedom
- Coat of arms: Reinhard Marx's coat of arms

Reinhard Marx (born 21 September 1953) is a German Catholic prelate who has served as Archbishop of Munich and Freising since 2008. Pope Benedict XVI made him a cardinal in 2010. He is a former member of the Council of Cardinals established by Pope Francis, serving from 2013 to 2023 and is a former president of the Commission of the Bishops' Conferences of the European Union (2012 – 2018). Marx is the Grand Prior of the German Lieutenancy of the Equestrian Order of the Holy Sepulchre of Jerusalem.

== Biography ==
Born in Geseke, North Rhine-Westphalia, Marx was ordained to the priesthood, for the Archdiocese of Paderborn, by Archbishop Johannes Joachim Degenhardt on 2 June 1979. He had studied in Paris alongside future fellow Cardinal Philippe Barbarin. He obtained a doctorate in theology from the University of Bochum in 1989.

On 23 July 1996, he was appointed Auxiliary Bishop of Paderborn and Titular Bishop of Petina by Pope John Paul II. He received his episcopal consecration on 21 September, his forty-third birthday, from Archbishop Degenhardt, with Bishops Hans Drewes and Paul Consbruch serving as co-consecrators.

On 20 December 2001 he was named Bishop of Trier, the oldest diocese in Germany.

Styles of Reinhard Marx
- Reference style: His Eminence
- Spoken style: Your Eminence
- Informal style: Cardinal
- See: Munich and Freising

On 30 November 2007 Pope Benedict XVI appointed Marx metropolitan archbishop of Munich and Freising, a position that Benedict held from 1977 to 1981. On 2 February 2008, Marx was installed as Archbishop of Munich and Freising in the Munich Frauenkirche. He became first Cardinal-Priest of San Corbiniano on 20 November 2010. Marx's title is that of Saint Corbinian, who was the first bishop of Freising and of whom Marx is the successor.

Marx currently serves as head of the committee for social issues at the German Bishops' Conference. In addition to his duties as archbishop of Munich, on 11 December 2010 Marx was named by Pope Benedict as a member of the Congregation for Catholic Education for a five-year renewable term. On 29 December 2010 he was appointed a member of the Pontifical Council for Justice and Peace.

On 7 March 2012, he was appointed a member of the Congregation for the Oriental Churches.

On 22 March 2012, the Commission of the Bishops' Conferences of the European Community elected him its president.

He was one of the cardinal electors who participated in the 2013 papal conclave that elected Pope Francis.

On 13 April 2013 he was appointed to a Council of Cardinal Advisers, a group established by Pope Francis, exactly a month after his election, to advise him and to study a plan for revising the Apostolic Constitution on the Roman Curia, Pastor Bonus.

On the question whether the Church should allow people who have divorced and attempted remarriage to partake in Holy Communion, it came to disagreements with Gerhard Ludwig Müller, the head of the Congregation of the Faith at the Vatican, in November 2013. Marx called for a wide debate on the treatment of the Catholic Church with those who have attempted remarriage.

When the Vatican suspended Franz-Peter Tebartz-van Elst in 2013 over his alleged lavish spending, Marx was also criticized as he spent around $11 million renovating the archbishop's residence and another $13 million for a guesthouse in Rome.

On 19 February 2014 he was confirmed as a member of the Congregation for the Oriental Churches until the end of his current five-year term.

On 12 March 2014 Marx was also elected chairman of the German Bishops' Conference as successor of Robert Zollitsch. He was elected in Münster by the German bishops and auxiliary bishops only in the fifth round of voting in which a simple majority is sufficient. He served in this capacity until his replacement Georg Bätzing was elected on 3 March 2020.

On 15 October 2020, Pope Francis renewed Marx's term on the Council of Cardinal Advisers.

It was reported in 2020 that Marx had accumulated a large personal fortune and received a state salary as a minister of almost 14000 Euros per month.

In May 2021, Marx offered his resignation as archbishop of Munich to Pope Francis, citing his responsibility for the response to the sexual abuse crisis. On 10 June 2021, the pope declined his resignation. He accepted Marx's description of clerical abuse as a "catastrophe" that requires every bishop to engage with it personally, to "put their own flesh on the line". He wrote: "We will not be saved by investigations or the power of institutions. The prestige of our Church which tends to conceal her sins will not save us; neither the power of money nor the opinion of the media will save us." Instead he proposed all "confess our nakedness" and admit to sin and ask for "the grace of shame". He compared Marx's statement to Peter's confession to Christ: "Turn away from me for I am a sinful man" and countered with Christ's exhortation to Peter: "Feed my sheep." (Note: The letter was written in informal Argentine Spanish, an indication that Pope Francis wrote it himself.)

In March 2023, Cardinal Marx was removed from Pope Francis's council of cardinals.

On 20 May 2023, Marx presided over the marriage of Prince Ludwig of Bavaria of the House of Wittelsbach and his bride Sophie-Alexandra Evekink in Munich. On January 19, 2024, Marx gave the prayer during the memorial for late German football star Franz Beckenbauer.

Marx broke his shoulder in March 2025.

Marx participated as a cardinal elector in the 2025 papal conclave that elected Pope Leo XIV.

On 2 February 2026, Marx opened the beatification process for Alfred Delp in Munich.

In June 2026, Marx carried out the requiem mass for former German minister of Culture Hans Maier.

== President of the Bishops' Conference of the European Community ==
He was elected as President of the Commission of the Bishops' Conferences of the European Community on 22 March 2012.

After Britain voted to leave the European Union in June 2016, Marx issued a statement saying: "This decision of the British voters should of course be respected, even if we, as COMECE, find it extremely regrettable." He praised the EU's "project of community and solidarity" but also stated: "We need to 'rethink' Europe in some way. ... we will only be able to build a good future if the nations of Europe are united. It also raises the question on the way to achieve the 'true European humanism' to which Pope Francis has encouraged the Europeans."

Despite protests by Catholics in Germany, including the Catholic Workers Movement, Marx spoke positively of the proposed Transatlantic Trade and Investment Partnership. He said: "Given today’s huge social and environmental challenges, I won’t have a good feeling if Europe pulls out of shaping globalization and leaves the issues and actions to others".

Following the Christmas market attack in Berlin in December 2016, Marx said "The news from Berlin have deeply shocked me. The violence on the Christmas market is the opposite of what visitors were seeking. My compassion goes to the relatives of the dead and injured. For all of them I will pray."

In April 2017, Marx met with Jean-Claude Juncker, the President of the European Commission, and he hailed the great achievements that had been made in Europe in recent history. In a joint statement with Anglican bishop Christopher Hill, Marx said: "In the decades since the founding of the European Union and its predecessor institutions, Europeans have benefitted from historic periods of peace, the expansion of democracy on the continent, and increased freedom to work, travel, and study,' and 'We believe more than ever in the European project and believe that a common path resting on shared values is the best path, ... A united Europe brings about peace in a world where peace cannot be taken for granted."

In May 2017, the leaders of COMECE met in Rome in relation to a high-level congress to take place in Rome on the theme 'Rethinking Europe'. On the occasion, Marx stated that putting the human person back at the centre of European public policy was, along with dying to oneself, the church's message and he further stated, "I see, when I meet politicians and 'other' people, that they are open to discuss. ...We cannot [do] politics, we are not politicians ... but we can enable the way."

On 2 December 2018, Marx attended the "Pulse of Europe" meeting in Munich and made statements in favour of greater European unity. He said "Nationalism means war. Germany first? That is egotism and won’t get us any further" and "The Romanian poor and the Italian unemployed are all our problem". He also said he did not understand why no one was speaking of United States of Europe any longer.

== Contribution to global Synod of Bishops ==
Marx participated in the Synod of Bishops on the Family in 2014 and 2015. In 2014, addressing a question raised on the family, he argued that church doctrine can change over time, and "doesn't depend on the spirit of time but can develop over time. ...Saying that the doctrine will never change is a restrictive view of things," Marx later clarified at a Vatican press conference: "The core of the Catholic Church remains the Gospel, but have we discovered everything? This is what I doubt."

Marx has supported the view that no sacramental [sic] second marriage is possible within Catholic teaching, but he wanted it to be possible that people whose marriages had "failed" could still be accepted within the church. He supported Cardinal Walter Kasper's proposal that Catholics who have divorced and attempted remarriage outside the Church be admitted to Communion, emphasizing that it would be applied to individual cases: "Not for no one, and not for everyone."

Though he once suggested that the German church might go in a different direction than the Synod, Marx insisted at the 2015 Synod that he would abide by whatever the Pope decided. He said "the Church is the only institution in the world that can reach unanimous agreement. Thank God we have the pope. We bishops do not have to decide. Church unity is not in danger. And once the pope has decided, we will abide by his decision."

When several cardinals who believed that no circumstances allow for someone who had attempted remarriage to receive communion published a set of questions asking for clarifications of Amoris Laetitia, Marx objected. He said that the exhortation was not ambiguous as some said, and that it did in fact allow for people to receive the Eucharist after attempted remarriage under certain circumstances. In February 2017, Marx, when speaking of the events surrounding this controversy, stated: "We have discussions in the church, normal discussions, tensions. It will be forever like this." Marx also said he believed that support for the Pope within the church was substantial.

== Coordinator for the Council of the Economy ==
In 2014, Pope Francis created a new agency for organizing the economic affairs of the Holy See called the 'Secretariat for the Economy'. In coordination with this, the Pope also created a council of bishops and laity who would oversee the secretariat known as the Council for the Economy. Marx was named as coordinator of this council.

The Vatican reported a budget deficit of 70 million Euros for the year 2018, which was double that of the previous year. Marx commented at the time that the deficit could be resolved within a year or two. In October 2019, he said "We have to go forward, otherwise I cannot see how to sign a budget with a structural deficit", also commenting that there "is a way we can go in several years. That is not a catastrophe." Measures instituted by Marx include centralising Vatican information technology provision and spacing out conferences over longer periods of time.

Vatican revenues and finances went into further collapse in 2020 during the COVID-19 pandemic.

In February 2020, Cardinal Marx announced he would not have accepted a new six-year mandate as head of the German Bishops' Conference, due to his age of 66. Two months later, Father Juan Antonio Guerrero, the head of the Vatican's Dicastery for Finances, and Marx sent a letter to Vatican offices to get them to drastically cut costs and revise their budgets for 2020. The contents of the letter called for a reduction of travel throughout the year, a cancellation of all conferences, meeting and ad limina visits, radical limits on consultancy and overtime, as well as to postpone all work to the following year which wasn't absolutely necessary.

== Views and Activities ==
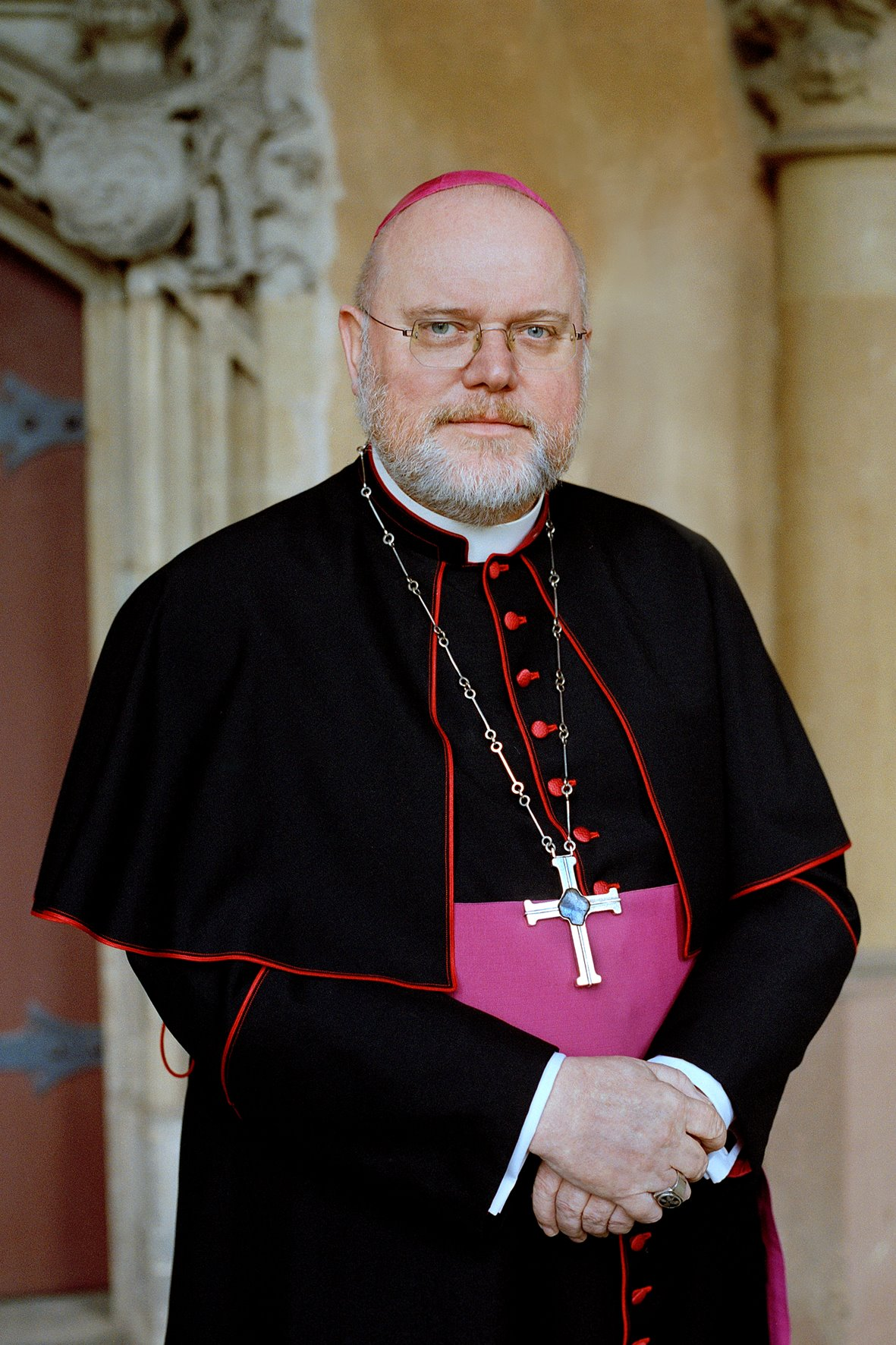
Marx in 2007

=== Economic reform ===
Marx has been critical of some aspects of capitalism and he has also promoted some economic reform ideas. While he was bishop of Trier, he criticized a culture of greed in modern capitalism and called for managers to subscribe to the social components of a social market economy.

In 2006 he criticized the 'audacious' salary hikes of top managers. He said: "We are more and more moving away from a social market economy to capitalism, where the return is the only thing that counts," adding that "The other goals of companies, like for example, generating jobs, are not kept in mind anymore. That’s a mistake." He also said "It’s pure capitalism without social responsibility. The other Marx from Trier could still be proven right. And that, I would find awful".

In 2020 he echoed Pope Francis's call for a universal basic income as part of recovery plans from the COVID-19 pandemic.

Marx is also a member of the World Economic Forum.

=== Homosexuality, gay rights, and the Church ===
In 2011, Marx was reported as saying that the Catholic Church "has not always adopted the right tone" toward LGBT people. He went on to add that, while he cannot officially bless a union between two people of the same sex, he can (and implicitly will) pray for their relationship if asked. "Homosexuality is not a sin. It corresponds to a Christian attitude" Marx said. Marx also admitted to blessing same-sex couples.

In 2014, Marx responded in an interview to the issues under consideration at the Synod of Bishops concerning the Church's treatment of people that are gay: "I have the impression that we have a lot of work to do in the theological field, not only related to the question of divorce, but also the theology of marriage. I am astonished that some can say, "Everything is clear" on this topic. Things are not clear. It is not about church doctrine being determined by modern times. It is a question of aggiornamento, to say it in a way that the people can understand, and to always adapt our doctrine to the Gospel, to theology, in order to find in a new way the sense of what Jesus said, the meaning of the tradition of the church and of theology and so on. There is a lot to do". He went on to say, "Take the case of two homosexuals who have been living together for 35 years and taking care of each other, even in the last phases of their lives. How can I say that this has no value?"

At the 2015 Synod in Rome, Marx urged his fellow bishops that, "We must make it clear that we do not only judge people according to their sexual orientation. ...If a same-sex couple are faithful, care for one another and intend to stay together for life God won't say 'All that doesn't interest me, I'm only interested in your sexual orientation.'"

Marx supports legal recognition for same-sex unions arguing that there are positive elements that can be found and supported in same-sex relationships, but is against same-sex marriage. In 2015, in Germany he stated: "Human dignity is not state-made, it’s not made by the constitution, which is why neither the constitution nor the state can pass judgment on it. ...And this also applies to the topic of marriage and the family."

In June 2016, on a visit to Ireland, Marx argued that the church and society had harmed gay people in the past and should publicly apologise.

In July 2017, in an interview with the Augsburger Allgemeine in Germany, Marx commented on the recent legalization of same-sex marriage in Germany and said that it was not a concern for the church. He said that church teaching cannot be moulded into the laws of a secular state and he said: "In a secular society, the state must make laws that are valid for everyone". He also lamented that the Catholic church in Germany had not done more in the past to fight against laws that criminalized homosexual activity in Germany.

In February 2018, it was widely reported that Marx said in an interview with German journalists that blessing of same-sex unions is possible in Catholic churches in Germany, but later clarified that he had not implied this and was misunderstood, stating that there merely could be "spiritual encouragement." In December 2019 Marx allegedly said again that same-sex couples can be blessed.

In February 2022, following a television documentary produced by a group called 'OutinChurch', in which 120 German priests, church employees and lay people identified themselves as LGBT, Cardinal Marx stated "Not everyone is obliged to declare [to others] their own sexual inclination, whether heterosexual or homosexual. It's up to him to decide," and "But if he does, then that must be respected and it is not a restriction on his ability to become a priest. This is my position and we must defend it". These remarks were themselves contrasted with current rules from the Holy See since 2005 that have banned same-sex attracted persons from being ordained to holy orders.

On 13 March 2022, Cardinal Marx celebrated a mass marking '20 years of queer worship and pastoral care' at St Paul's parish church in Munich. The sanctuary was decorated with a rainbow flag during the event. He said on the occasion that he was shocked by the ongoing discrimination against the homosexual community by Christians. He also said "I desire an inclusive Church. A Church that includes all who want to walk the way of Jesus." He called for a 'dynamic of openness', referring to the synodal path of the Catholic Church in Germany, and said that this was what Pope Francis meant when he spoke about the need to "discover what the Spirit has to say to us today."

Later in March 2022, Marx expressed an openness to changing the teaching of the Catechism regarding homosexuality, saying that "[t]he Catechism is not set in stone. One may also question what it says." He also went on to say that "Homosexuality is not a sin. It corresponds to a Christian attitude when two people, regardless of gender, stand up for each other, in joy and sorrow." He added that LGBTQ persons are loved by God as a part of His creation, and that they should not be discriminated against. Marx also admitted to blessing two same-sex couples several years prior in Los Angeles. He expressed an openness to blessing same-sex couples but reiterated that the Church cannot offer them the sacrament of matrimony.

It was reported in August 2022, that Marx was going to award the Catholic Media Prize to the LGBT documentary "Wie Gott uns schuf – Coming-out in der Katholischen Kirche". Marx was going to give out this award as part of his role as chairman of the journalistic commission of the German bishops' conference.

In December 2023, when the Vatican announced the possibility of blessing same-sex relationships, Marx expressed surprise that the decision came so quickly. He said that Catholic sexual doctrine still needs to develop further. He commented about this decision: "for some in the Universal Church, it is huge to hear that this should be possible".

In April 2025, the German bishops' conference approved new guidelines for blessings for homosexual couples and others in irregular unions, entitled “Blessing Strengthens Love”. Cardinal Marx encouraged priests in the archdiocese of Munich and Freising to adopt these blessings, noting that they were not meant to be sacramental marriages. Pope Leo, when asked by a reporter about Marx's decision in April 2026, stated, “The Holy See has made it clear that we do not agree with the formalized blessing of couples, in this case homosexual couples, or couples in irregular situations, beyond what was specifically, if you will, allowed for by Pope Francis in saying that all people receive blessings,”. Marx had a meeting with Pope Leo shortly afterwards.The Dicastery for the Doctrine of the Faith published a letter in May 2026, which had been sent in 2024, which instructed the German bishops that their plans to engage in such blessings ran afoul of Fiducia Supplicans. Despite the Vatican's opposition, Marx and other German bishops, however, continued to encourage his priests to carry out these blessings. The Vatican took no punitive actions in response and instead engaged in dialogue with Marx and the German bishops.

In July 2026, a group of 26 priests from the Archdiocese of Munich and Freising published a letter in which they questioned Marx's guidelines to carry out blessings of couples in irregular unions, including homosexual unions, within the archdiocese. They alleged that the guidelines contradicted church teaching and went beyond what was permitted in Fiducia supplicans. Marx responded by proposing that the guidelines would be a pilot project carried out for one year. Pope Leo met with Marx several days after the publication of this letter.

=== Abortion, suicide and euthanasia ===
Marx is an active opponent of abortion in Germany and has also spoken against physician-assisted suicide as well as embryonic stem cell research. On the occasion of the 2015 pro-life march in Germany, he publicly stated: "As Christians we share the conviction that the inviolable dignity of every human being has its origin in God, the Creator of all life."

German Catholic and Protestant leaders, including Marx, began an anti-suicide campaign in 2019. A mass was held in the city of Hanover to initiate the campaign. On the occasion, Cardinal Marx preached the homily and said, "We want to be where we are needed, as Jesus of Nazareth has told us.... In order for the silence and taboo to stop.... [Society] must wake up to the issue".

=== Church role in the modern world ===
In a visit to Ireland in June 2016, Marx said that Christianity is the 'religion of the future'. He quoted the speech by Ratzinger (later Pope Benedict XVI) in Paris in 2000, when Ratzinger said that Christianity was not a faith that dealt with 'magic things' but with the real world. Marx said that Christianity had a role in making the world a better place. He said that in past times there were occasions when the church was on 'the wrong side' of various issues, but that in the future it must rely on its own social doctrine and Christian anthropology as a source from which to help make a new and better society, which also embraced the marginalized. He also expressed concern over a tendency by some to want to go back to a dream of society where things were 'more cohesive and simpler', and that future debates would be about identity and security rather than freedom.

On the occasion of the death of former German Chancellor Helmut Kohl in June 2017, Marx praised Kohl (who was a practicing Catholic) as an example of Christian witness in the modern world. Marx praised Kohl's work for German reunification, work for democracy and human rights, work for European integration, and his work to create a social market economy in Germany based on church teaching. Marx said of Kohl: "The Church in Germany is grateful for the Christian testimony of Helmut Kohl. Wherever the values of a free society were trampled on in the world, he pledged that these values be respected. He wanted and knew how to show his Christian convictions in Europe."

In October 2017, Marx along with other bishops and European politicians attended a conference in Rome entitled "Thinking Europe: A Christian Contribution to the Future of the European Project" that was meant to discuss the role of religion in the future of Europe. On the occasion, Marx commented that 20 years prior, many people thought that religion would disappear from society, but that that was not the case. He stated that the great fear for religion was not that it would disappear but rather "it will be instrumentalized for other reasons, for political reasons. That will be perhaps the great fear for the 21st century."

In 2018, after Pope Francis had endorsed Pope Benedict's rejection of the "Marxist state", Marx told an interviewer that without Karl Marx "there would not be any Catholic social doctrine" and that Marx the 19th-century sociologist is not responsible for the crimes of those who claim to be inspired by him.

On 1 September 2018, the anniversary of the German invasion of Poland, Marx visited the Polish city of Gdansk and paid tribute to the Polish Solidarity movement supported by the church that had fought against communism in the 1980s. In an interview on the occasion, he spoke about future of Europe and said that the church was in favour of European unification and against Nationalism. On the occasion, he said, "Faith tells us we belong to a human family. Patriotism is good, but nationalism is not Catholic. I agree with Franz-Josef Strauss, who has always said: Bavaria is our home, Germany is our fatherland, Europe is our future."

While attending the Synod on Youth in Rome in October 2018, Marx said that Pope Francis had decided to use synods as a way of moving the church forward and that it was important for the church to accompany young adults at their sensitive age, otherwise the church would be "a lost playing field" for evangelization. He reiterated his call for women to be given real participation in the church's decision-making process and his view that the church would be foolish not to make use of their potential.

In July 2023, Marx expressed concern over a report about masses of people leaving the Catholic church in Germany. He said that all in the church need to ask themselves: "Why am I a Christian, and what does it mean?" and that the church needed to reveal the answer to this.

Marx celebrated the funeral mass for Bavarian politician Alois Glück in March 2024. On the occasion, he said that Christian society looks for justice and solidarity, and he also encouraged more young people will seek the common good.

Following the Christmas market attack in Magdeburg in 2024, Marx spoke about the need to have hope amidst the violence and troubles going on in the world. He said that without hope, victory was being conceded to those who create conflict.

In March 2025, CSU leader Markus Söder asked church leaders to show restraint in discussing political matters, but Marx pushed back on these comments and said that the church's mission embraced wider social topics.

=== Migration ===
Marx has consistently criticized European policies towards asylum seekers, saying that they keep away people who need help. On the occasion of the sinking of a migrant boat near Lampedusa in 2013, he said:

For years, we have followed a policy which has prevented those in need reaching our shores. This is not the kind of Europe we want. To claim asylum is a fundamental human right which we must respect. Refugees and asylum seekers deserve to be treated humanely.

On 5 September 2015, Marx along with Lutheran bishop Heinrich Bedford-Strohm, members of the clergy and crowds of Germans enthusiastically welcomed Syrian refugees coming to Germany at the Munich train station.

He has also spoken out against xenophobia and violence done against migrants in Germany. He said that Catholics are not allowed to be xenophobic.

In September 2015, he chaired a meeting of COMECE joined by the Conference of European Churches, which had been convened to discuss the Syrian migrant crisis in Europe. Marx made clear that "Those who enter Europe must not be afraid to drown or suffocate. And they must get a fair asylum process. These are minimum standards which must apply throughout Europe."

Following the 2015-2016 New Year's Eve attacks on women in Germany and the discovery that most of the violence was carried out by people from the Middle East or North Africa who entered Germany as refugees, Marx condemned the violence: "These new forms of violence and especially the inhumane treatment of women cannot be tolerated" and he demanded that "all the different forces in society must work together to prevent this type of incidents and guarantee safety."

On 6 February 2016, he remarked that Germany cannot take in all of the world's refugees and that there needs to be a reduction in the number coming in. There had already been 1.1 million migrants entering Germany in the past year up to that point, and an unknown number yet to come. He said that in order to help refugees, it needed not only "charity but also reason". At the same time, Marx also criticized the anti-foreigner sentiments growing in Germany that had been spreading in society.

In September 2016, an aide to the head of the Christian Social Union (CSU) party in Germany made negative comments about refugees, saying it was hard to deport them. Marx criticized the remarks and said that politicians should by finding ways to integrate them, rather than get rid of them.

At the 2016 St Michael's reception in Berlin, Marx addressed a crowd of 800, including Chancellor Merkel, and praised Germany's policy of welcoming in refugees. He also warned against nationalism and stated: "Patriotism yes, we love our homeland, but any form of nationalism must be opposed."

In February 2017, Marx praised Chancellor Angela Merkel over her policy towards refugees: "In a critical phase of Europe, you have set an important sign of humanity and given an example of Christian love of neighbor in politics," he said, adding, "she knows that Christians must not simply let the world run its course. We have helped shape it!" Marx also criticized populist movements, stating that "a retreat to the national, to the closed is no Christian option."

In the wake of the German parliamentary elections in September 2017 that saw the far-right AfD party enter the German parliament for the first time, Marx spoke out in support of reaffirming Germany's commitment to help migrants and refugees, saying: "For Christians, who'll be present in all parties, topics of fundamental importance will include dealing with foreigners seeking our protection and with our society's poor and disadvantaged. ...In the common struggle for the right path, black-and-white images of hate and exclusion aren't appropriate."

In July 2018, the Bavarian Christian Social Union (CSU) party nearly pushed Angela Merkel's government to the brink of collapse after it demanded that she do more to restrict the number of migrants entering Germany. In response, Marx criticized the CSU for going against Christian values: "A party that has chosen the C in the name has an obligation, in the spirit of Christian social teaching, especially in its attitude towards the poor and the weak".

In July 2020 a Benedictine abbess named Mechthild Thürmer in Bavaria sheltered a migrant at her Abbey who the government wanted to deport. The abbess granted church asylum to the migrant and a Bamberg court threatened her with imprisonment. Marx and other Bavarian bishops came out in strong support for the abbess. Marx commented: "The bishops see no reason for a court sentence. They fully support the tradition of church asylum, which lays bare the exceptionally inhuman hardship of the EU asylum system".

In November 2023, Cardinal Marx criticized the anti-immigration Alternative for Germany party and said that its positions were incompatible with the Catholic faith. He also questioned whether AfD supporters should be allowed to hold office in the church.

On the occasion of the 2024 Katholikentag, Marx spoke against the AfD and others, claiming that right-wing politicians were taking advantage of insecurity by blaming problems on others.

In July 2026, Marx ordained the first Korean-born priest in the Archdiocese of Munich and Freising.

=== Environment ===
Marx has asserted that climate change and the refugee crisis are the two biggest problems facing Europe. He has repeated Pope Francis' words in asserting the existence of an 'ecological debt' of richer more developed nations to poorer less developed nations. He has said that the Church can learn from the world in 'recognizing the signs of the times'.

It was reported in May 2025 that Marx runs workshops that manufacture solar energy technology for school education programs.

=== Foreign relations ===
Marx has served as the representative of the church in Germany in other parts of the world.

In 2015, he visited the United States, including the US-Mexican border. He spoke about this experience in 2016, by saying, "When I visited the U.S.-Mexican border last year and saw the Mexico-United States barrier with its series of walls, I thought to myself that cannot be the future of European borders."

In January 2016, he visited Viet Nam and had a meeting with the chief of the Vietnamese Fatherland Front, a communist party umbrella-organization that has control of all social organizations within Viet Nam. The President of the Front stated that relations between Viet Nam and the Holy See had greatly improved, and that the church in Viet Nam was engaging in many activities that benefited Vietnamese society. Marx expressed his hope that the Front would assist in developing Catholicism in Viet Nam and facilitating humanitarian activities among the Catholic community.

During the same visit, Marx was refused permission to travel to Vinh diocese, without any stated reason from official sources. It may have been related to the cases of religious persecution that had occurred in Vinh against the clergy and laity of the diocese. Marx said that "no political and economic organizations can injure religious freedom".

In June 2025 Ecumenical Patriarch Bartholomew I visited Germany and met with Cardinal Marx in Munich.

=== Reconciliation ===
On 22 November 2015, to mark the 50th anniversary of the exchange of letters between German and Polish bishops in 1965, German and Polish bishops met at the monastery of Jasna Góra in Poland. Marx gave the homily at the Mass where Polish Archbishop Stanisław Gądecki was the celebrant. Representatives of each country's bishops signed a statement about their common mission to build a Europe based on Christianity and the need for continued efforts to recover from their past as wartime adversaries.

They also noted with grief about the situation in Ukraine, whose territorial integrity had been breached by separatists backed by Russia. They also praised the work of Polish bishops 50 years ago, who had been the first to reach out to German bishops, even though their nation had been the victim of the war. They also called for Christian to reach out to the refugees from other parts of the world and to protect all human life from conception until natural death.

In September 2016, in anticipation of the 500th anniversary of the Reformation, Marx and Lutheran bishop Heinrich Bedford-Strohm called for healing of past wounds between Catholics and Protestants. Their statement said: "A look at history reveals the suffering and wounds that Christians have inflicted on each other. This shocks and shames us. ...We see it as an exceptional moment of our fellowship, after centuries of mutual separation, to mark a Reformation anniversary with such readiness to engage in forgiveness and a new beginning." They planned to mark the anniversary with a mutual ecumenical meeting at Hildesheim on 11 March 2017 where "we will confess our guilt before God on behalf of our churches, asking God and each other for forgiveness and committing ourselves before God to continue to deepen our togetherness". Marx said of Luther："We as Catholics can now clearly say that Luther never wanted to create a new Church."

In February 2017, Marx attended an ecumenical meeting of Catholics and Lutherans in Stuttgart to release revised versions of German translations of the Catholic and Lutheran bibles. At the event, Marx said, "I am very pleased that we are placing God's word in our midst in such an ecumenically meaningful year as 2017, in which we together recall the events of the Reformation 500 years ago and celebrate them today as a celebration of Christ, to place God's word in our midst."

In August 2020, Marx and Lutheran Bishop Heinrich Bedford-Strohm were awarded the 2020 Augsburg Peace Prize for their "unconditional will to live together in peace". Marx was praised for his commitment to ecumenical dialogue and cooperation between the two churches that had long been divided for the past 500 years. Marx said on the occasion: "Christianity in Germany and Europe will only have a future if we strongly work together and stay together ecumenically. That is important, and that is where I see the prize as encouragement".

In September 2019, representatives of the Catholic and Protestant churches in Germany proposed "reciprocal Eucharistic hospitality". In September 2020, the Congregation for the Doctrine of the Faith criticized it for doctrinal errors. Marx supported the proposal, saying that plans were "already far advanced" and that "the ball is in the Vatican's court". He said: "I would like to see Christians celebrate the eucharist together, without becoming a unified Church. Ecumenism only works if we try to understand the position of others and sometimes accept differences."

In July 2023, Marx met with a delegation from the Italian village of Filetto di Camarda and apologized on behalf of the diocese to them on account of the wartime atrocity committed there by Matthias Defregger, former auxiliary bishop of Munich. On the occasion he said, "It is never good to suppress the truth...but it is crucial to always look at the truth and make it an impulse to move forward."

In August 2024, it was reported that Marx had written a letter to Romani Rose, the President of the Central Council of Sinti and Roma in Germany, in which he acknowledged a moral failure of the church to help Sinti and Roma during the Nazi period.

=== Church reform ===
Marx has taught that Catholic doctrine remains the same, but the church's understanding of it changes over time. He has said that theology and doctrine are not the same, and that theology can change, but doctrine can't. He has said that "truth does not change but we gain greater understanding of the truth as we grow... We don't own the truth, the truth owns us, since it is a person we encounter, not something we possess."

While at the 2015 Synod of the family, he contrasted Pope Pius XI's encyclical Casti connubii and Pope John Paul II's Apostolic Exhortation 'Familiaris Consortio' as evidence of the church's living tradition.

In relation to the 2001 Congregation for Divine Worship's document Liturgiam Authenticam, which called for literal translations of the Latin into the vernacular, Marx commented that it was too 'narrow in view' and a 'dead end'.

In June 2017, Marx called for the global church to admit more women into top leadership positions. He said: "And that is why I want to emphasize that positions of responsibility and executive positions in the Church that are open to lay people must be shared by both men and women."

In 2018, Marx and a majority of other German bishops supported a proposal to allow Protestant spouses of German Catholics to receive the Eucharist at Mass. However, a minority of German bishops opposed this proposal and appealed to the Vatican for clarification of the issue. Archbishop Luis Ladaria, representing Pope Francis, issued a statement in June 2018 that temporarily rejected the German proposal on several grounds, including that it was an issue for the wider church as a whole to consider.

In September 2019, Marx gave his support to the idea of having married priests within certain regions and under certain conditions.

In 2019, Filippo Iannone, who at the time served as President of the Pontifical Council for Legislative Texts within the Vatican Curia, wrote to Cardinal Marx warning him that the German Synod's path to discuss things like priestly celibacy, female ordination, and the separation of powers could not be decided by a local church, but could only be decided at the level of the universal church.

In July 2020, the Vatican's Congregation of the Clergy issued a document on parish reform entitled: "The pastoral conversion of the parish community at the service of the evangelizing mission of the Church". Many German bishops criticized this document, including Marx, who criticized the way that the document was issued from the Vatican without consultation at the local level. In Munich Cathedral, on 24 July, he said: "It is a little strange that a document arrives from Rome without ever having been discussed with us. Is this the coexistence of the universal Church with the particular Church that they have desired? Not really!". He then added: "It is not for one person to proclaim something and for others to simply follow, but to listen to each other, to learn together, to absorb the experiences of the local Church—which is missing from the document that has been released these days. As if in Germany we had never thought of missionary parishes!". However, Marx welcomed Pope Francis' drive for a more synodal church.

From 30 September to 2 October 2021, Marx and other German bishops attended a plenary assembly for discussing the 'German Synodal Path' in Frankfurt. Marx spoke in favour of the text that was passed that discussed power and checks and balances, he said: "I think the text is good because it is realistic and does not say that we want to change canon law but that we can move forward step by step".

In 2022, Marx expressed his support for allowing married priests in order to both end priest sexual abuse and combat priest loneliness.

Following the publication of the report on sex abuse in the Munich archdiocese in early 2022, Cardinal Marx spoke out in favour of lifting celibacy rules for priests. Speaking to the Süddeutsche Zeitung newspaper, Marx said that things cannot continue as they are. He also said: "And if some say: without the obligation of celibacy, they will all get married! My answer is: so what! If they all marry, it would at least be a sign that things are not currently working."

At the 102nd German Katholikentag in 2022, Cardinal Marx criticized the church's "speechlessness" in relation to the clerical abuse scandal. He also criticized the Vatican's "no" to gay blessings in 2021, claiming it was "not only theologically skimpy", but also “decidedly offbeat."

At the 'Synodal Path' meeting held in Frankfurt in September 2022, a proposed document calling for changes to church teaching on various subjects, including sex, gender and masturbation, failed to pass as a result of a lack of necessary votes. Pope Francis had already warned the German church against adopting teachings that had not been adopted by the universal church. Cardinal Marx had supported the document and said after the vote that he was 'very disappointed. The bishops must also publicly stand by their positions and should justify them.' At the same meeting, Cardinal Marx said that the Pope wanted a 'synodal church' and that the church in Germany was following this path.

In a September 2022 interview with La Croix, Marx claimed that they had no intention of 'rewriting dogma' and that the proposals at the Synodal Path to allow for blessings for homosexual couples and remarried divorcees were a 'change of paradigm and perspective'. He said that he felt some in Rome and other places were looking at the German synodal path with apprehension and that it was therefore important to present theological texts that were well argued.

In November 2022, the German bishops made their ad limina visit to Rome. The Synodal Way was criticized by some Vatican cardinals during the visit and Cardinal Marx responded that he viewed this criticism as an opinion rather than a papal decision.

In December 2022, Cardinal Marx had an interview in which he commented on the Pope's view on the Synodal Way. On the occasion, he said: "The Pope is open at least to the fact that the [Synodal] Way continues...But he has to keep an eye on the big picture. As bishops, we want to work to ensure that the connection to the path of the whole Church continues to be possible."

In February 2023, prior to the opening of the German bishops' spring plenary meeting, Cardinal Marx spoke in favour of the Synodal process and said it was only the beginning of the beginning while comparing it with the changes brought by the Second Vatican Council. He commented, "Why are we so afraid of what is to come?"

A Catholic museum in Freising put on an exhibition entitled 'Damned Lust – Church. Body. Art' about the Catholic Church's relationship with human sexuality. The exhibition was reportedly conceived by Marx himself and was meant to show the strained relationship between many Catholics and sexuality, including repression and double standards concerning sexuality.

In November 2024, following the conclusion of the 'Synod on Synodality' in Rome, Marx said that the final document left questions open. Commenting on the fact that the document failed to address some of the controversial questions raised during the synod (eg. women's ordination, LGBTQ issues) and how a few German bishops who had boycotted the German Synodal path felt vindicated by this, Marx said "“But they are still in the world. The decision about what is considered important must be made locally...to say that it was not discussed at the world Synod, then we must not talk about it either, I find that a bit strange.".

In January 2026, Marx stated that he had the goal of making the Synodal way “a model for the universal Church.”

In February 2026, Marx reportedly spoke against the creation of a permanent synodal conference with power to monitor the implementation of its decisions.

In April 2026 Marx denounced criticism of the German Synodal Way, claiming that there was an organized campaign on social media to discredit it as a schismatic movement.

=== 2025 Conclave ===
Marx took part in the Rite of Transfer of the Pope's body following his death. Marx along with Cardinal Tagle and Cardinal Dominique Mamberti served in the 'Particular Congregation' that serves to help manage preparations for a conclave during a period of Sede Vacante following the death of a pope. Marx served in his prior role as coordinator for the Council of Economy during the conclave.

During the pre-conclave period, Marx spoke out that the next Pope needed to be someone who would continue Francis's legacy of reform and that he was impressed by the number of leaders who came to Francis's funeral. He also speculated that the conclave would be short. During pre-conclave discussions on Vatican finances, in which Marx gave a full day of presentation to other cardinals, Marx presented challenges and proposals from the perspective of sustainability.

Some news outlets speculated the Marx could have been a possible contender for the papacy at the 2025 conclave. He was also referred to as a 'kingmaker' who could sway the vote.

During the period before the 2025 conclave, Marx was reported to have been privately supporting Robert Prevost (later Leo XIV's) candidacy. He held meetings with cardinals at his house in Rome to discuss Prevost's candidacy.. Marx supposedly highly valued Prevost for finding a way to save the German 'Synodal Way' while Prevost headed the dicastery for bishops, and also Marx's own experience with the Vatican's precarious finances may have led him to think that American help was needed. Marx had also publicly been commenting in the pre-conclave meetings that it should not matter what continent that the future pope would come from or what language he spoke.

Following the election of Pope Leo XIV Marx spoke positively about the conclave's choice, saying "We didn't have any debates in the pre-conclave about people in plenary, but in small circles or when you meet someone, you say what about this one, what about that one. And I immediately noticed a man who has a broad horizon, comes from the United States, has worked in Latin America for a long time and then came here to Rome two years ago, was also Superior General of the Augustinians for twelve years in between, so a very, very broad field, linguistically and culturally. That convinced me to say that this could be a possibility. So in the end, I can tell you, I am very happy"

He claimed to have met Prevost in the year earlier and said 'I realised he’s a man who listens, takes arguments seriously, weighs them. You can’t just place him into one camp – he really tries to build bridges. I liked that very much.'

In the 2026 'Pope's Sunday' held on the anniversary of the Pope's election in Munich, Cardinal Marx spoke favourably of Pope Leo's first year in office and his role in establishing church unity.

=== Ecumenism ===
While president of the German Conference of Catholic Bishops, Marx supported the guide the organization issued to allow for Lutheran spouses of Catholics to receive Holy Communion in Catholic churches.

In January 2025, during an ecumenical gathering for the week of prayer for Christian unity, Marx spoke against using religion to portray populist politicians as 'saviours'. He said, "That doesn’t work. The only saviour is Christ himself".

=== Persecution of Christians ===
In April 2017, during the Good Friday service held in Munich, Marx lamented the persecution of Christians that occurred in the world, especially in nations that had been shaped by Islam: "there can be no peace between religions," he said, unless "all human beings are permitted to live their faith and be respected in it."

=== Violence and religion ===
In June 2017, during an interview Marx said that religious leaders needed to be on guard to make sure that they did not provide a kind of pious framework from which religious extremists could perform violence. He indicated that both Catholics and Muslims needed to think about this. He said, "Religions simply must ask themselves—and permit themselves to be asked—whether by the way they are being interpreted or lived, they are contributing toward justifying or even fueling conflicts".

In September 2022, Cardinal Marx criticized the Russian Orthodox church for supporting Russia's war in Ukraine.

Following the 2025 Munich car attack, Cardinal Marx said "I am shocked and horrified at this horrible accident in which people have become victims of arbitrary violence in a public space. We do not know yet what the driver’s reasons are. My prayers go to the victims and their families, and I thank the emergency services for their fast rescue." He later led an interfaith memorial service at the Munich Cathedral.

=== Science and Technology ===
In June 2026, Cardinal Marx spoke about the need for human control over AI.

=== Democracy, peace and human rights ===
In August 2020, Marx spoke out in favour of the pro-democracy protestors in Belarus. On 15 August, he preached in Munich Cathedral: "Everywhere where people rise up and defend human dignity, the dignity of life and the dignity of freedom, one becomes conscious of Easter and that includes Belarus. Easter means rising up against hatred, violence and injustice".

In September 2020, Marx spoke out against an attempt in the Danish parliament to ban non-medical circumcision. He said, "The Catholic Church in the European Union considers any attempt on the fundamental right to freedom of religion as unacceptable. The criminalization of circumcision is a very grave measure that raises deep concern".

Following the Russian invasion of Ukraine, Cardinal Marx attended a Ukrainian Catholic divine liturgy in Munich on 27 February 2022. He made a direct appeal to Patriarch Kirill of the Russian Orthodox Church to use his influence to put an end to the war. He said, 'I implore the Patriarch of Moscow to exert his influence on the president so that the war stops and arms are laid down' and 'While we bishops are not politicians, it is our task and our duty to proclaim the Gospel’s message of peace – especially to those who are of the opinion that they can push their political aims on people with force and terror'. On the occasion, he also assured Ukrainian Catholics that they could count on the aid and solidarity of German Catholics. Following the end of the liturgy, he and Bishop Bohdan Dzyurakh of the Ukrainian Catholic Church in Germany, together prayed the prayer of peace in German and Ukrainian that John Paul II had prayed shortly before the beginning of the 1991 Iraq war.

Marx criticized Patriarch Kirill in an October 2022 interview for supporting the war in Ukraine as a 'holy war', which Marx considered as something that was 'behind us'. While Marx himself supported giving weapons to Ukraine as a 'lesser evil', in the same interview he took issue with people criticizing pacifists who were against this and said: "I find it bad that pacifists are being denigrated as idiots."

In a Christmas Eve message in 2022, Cardinal Marx and Annette Kurschus, the head of the Evangelical Church in Germany, condemned war and violence while justifying Ukraine's right to defend itself against Russian aggression. On the occasion, Marx stated: "Any war rhetoric that relativizes the victims on all sides contradicts the Christmas message".

In June 2023, Marx awarded the Catholic Fritz Gerlich Prize to the Danish film Unruly about a woman in 1933 consigned to an institution for disobeying social norms.

Following the re-election of Donald Trump in the United States in November 2024 and fears about Germany's own political situation, Marx tried to calm fears. He said, "No civil war is threatening us...Rather, we can make a new beginning in an orderly way," the cardinal said, according to CNA Deutsch, CNA’s German-language news partner. "I believe we underestimate in our country what it means to have functioning institutions that can also deal with difficult situations".

In October 2025, Marx made comments about US politics and said that the church cannot succumb to US political divides. He said that while right-wing politics sometimes points to connections with the church, “but what comes from the extreme right is always divisive”.

In January 2026, Marx made comments in response to Pope Leo's comments about how freedom of expression was declining, including in the west with the use of 'Orwellian' language that promised inclusivity, but shut out differences of opinion. Marx said he couldn't make sense of the comments and wished the Pope gave more specific examples.

In his 2026 Easter sermon, Marx criticized US defense secretary Pete Hegseth and Russian Orthodox Patriarch Kirill for using Christ by using Him to justify war.

In May 2026, Marx voice opposition to Europe's rearmament. He said, “If everything consists solely of arming ourselves to the teeth, being militarily stronger than others, and defending our well-being against the poor of the world, that is too little,”

== Opposition ==
During the 2015 Synod on the family, Marx faced opposition from other bishops for supporting Kasper's proposal that the rules be relaxed to allow people who have divorced and attempted remarriage to receive Holy Communion. Divisions were particularly acute between the group of bishops from Germany (notably Marx), and conservatives such as George Pell of Sydney. Marx accused Pell of trying to foster division by making it seem as if there were two camps within the Church, one around Pope Benedict XVI and the other around Kasper. A spokesman for Pell welcomed the suggestion that Marx saw no differences between the two groups.

Marx was indirectly criticized by retired Pope Benedict in a 2016 book of interviews. The occasion was related to how, shortly before Benedict's resignation in 2013, Marx had criticized him by saying he had turned the Roman curia into his own court. In response to this, Benedict said "I have always lived simply, always, ever since my childhood." The retired Pope's personal secretary Georg Gänswein also stated "One should be careful of making statements or valuations of a situation that one does not know well.". When Pope Benedict died on 31 December 2022, Cardinal Marx praised him and said "We mourn a faithful witness to God’s love and an important teacher of the Church, whose proclamation already shone far beyond the borders of the Archdiocese during his time as Archbishop of Munich.". Marx held a requiem mass for Benedict on 3 January at the Munich Cathedral, during which he both praised Benedict, but also welcomed "his critics and those who look ambivalently on his life, one with failures that every life has".

In August 2020, the German Bishops Conference published a photo of Marx posed in front of a monumental statue of Karl Marx on its Facebook page. A Polish Catholic magazine, Polonia Christiana, said the photo showed "where contemporary modernist Catholicism has gone". It described the cardinal as "inspired by the Red Revolution not only in economics" but even in supporting sexual "liberation". It said he was "trying to reinterpret Scripture and Tradition in the light of contemporary (anti) culture and the often questionable findings of science".

Marx and other German bishops have been widely criticized, including from other bishops, about a 'synodal' path for reform of the church that they are alleged to be conducting within the church in Germany. Attempts by Marx and the German bishops to try to have synods that make decisions for church issues within Germany are seen by such critics as being on a path to 'schism' and 'heresy'. Others, however, have given support for this path, including Brisbane Archbishop Mark Coleridge who dismissed the criticism and said in May 2021 "I have great confidence in the Germans (and) in Marx".

In 2021, Pope Emeritus Benedict XVI sent a letter to Marx expressing 'great concern' about the Synodal Path and that it would lead to disastrous outcomes.

Cardinal Gerhard Müller criticized Marx in June 2021 in an article in the Bonn General-Anzeiger. Müller, who has himself been severely criticized for his handling of abuse accusations, claimed that the Cologne abuse crisis was not about abuse but was an attempt by Marx to discredit Cardinal Woelki, who was opposed to the German 'synodal path' being supported by Marx. Müller alleged that the synodal path Marx was initiating was an "attempt to react to the abuse crisis with a heretical and schismatic agenda". Cardinal Müller criticized Marx again in September 2022 when he spoke regarding texts that Marx and Bishop Batzing were supporting that were calling for the Pope to change church teachings on sexual morality and the ordination of women: "There are two errors in this that only theologically ignorant can commit: 1) the Pope has no authority to change the teaching of the Church, which is based on God’s revelation. By doing so, he would exalt himself as a man above God. 2) the apostles can only teach and order what Jesus commanded them to teach (Mt 28:19)". In November 2022, in another interview, Müller criticized Cardinal Marx for putting away his pectoral cross when he visited the city of Jerusalem out of respect for other faiths.

In February 2022, Czech Cardinal Dominik Duka accused Cardinal Marx of "defaming and tarnishing" the reputation of former Pope Benedict XVI. This was due to the fact that the report on sex abuse in the Munich archdiocese, which had been commissioned by Cardinal Marx, faulted Pope Benedict (then Joseph Ratzinger) for his handling of four cases of sex abuse while he was serving as Archbishop of Munich in the 1970s and 1980s. Marx expressed grief over the findings of the report and said that the church needed to change, however, he did not make any public statement about the findings as it related to Pope Benedict. Cardinal Duka, however, held Marx responsible for damaging Pope Benedict's reputation through the report.

After Cardinal Marx's interview on 31 March 2022, was published in which he appeared to call for change to the church teaching on homosexuality, Bishop Joseph Strickland of the Diocese of Tyler in Texas accused him of apostasy on Twitter and called on him to resign.

American cardinal Raymond Leo Burke in a May 2022 interview claimed that the German bishops who were advocating changes to church teaching on homosexuality or women's ordination were supporting heresy. He claimed in the same interview that they should either renounce their position or be removed from their offices as bishops.

During the 2025 conclave, Cardinal Muller reportedly criticized Marx's emphasis on economic concerns for choosing the next pope, by saying “We have to elect the successor of Peter, not of Judas!”

When Marx and other German bishops in 2026 supported doing formalized blessings for homosexual couples, even against Vatican instructions to the contrary, Youtube priest personality Santiago Martin criticized them and said that if the Vatican didn't punish them, then it was evidence that the church was run by the 'god of money'. Kazakh bishop Athanasius Schneider also harshly criticized Marx for this.

== Sexual abuse ==
German media reported that an unidentified priest in the diocese of Trier had allegedly sexually abused minors, and that this priest was not removed by Cardinal Marx when he was bishop of Trier, even though he had been made aware of the case. Cardinal Marx's spokesperson claimed that Marx had acted with the relevant guidelines in place at the time. It was further claimed by the media that the priest continued to serve in Trier until 2015 and his abuse also allegedly continued up until that point. The rules governing these cases were reformed in 2010 and 2013, and the spokesperson claimed that had the new rules been in place at the time, the church would have acted differently.

Marx opened a meeting of bishops in Fulda in late September 2018 to discuss a study concerning widespread sexual abuse within the German church. The study had been commissioned by the German bishops' conference and given to the press in September 2018, and it showed widespread sexual abuse had occurred in the German church from 1946 to 2014, with almost 4,000 victims abused. On the occasion, Marx said the report "makes it clear to us that the Catholic Church has by no means overcome the issue of dealing with the sexual abuse of minors." "I feel we have reached a turning point about the issues such as prevention and the treatment of victims, but also about how the Church will deal with its own future" and "We must do more: listen, understand and take appropriate measures."

In February 2019 Marx spoke at a conference on paedophilia in the Catholic church summoned by Pope Francis, saying that procedures to prosecute offenders "were deliberately not complied with", and files were destroyed, or not created, allowing abuse to continue. "Instead of the perpetrators, the victims were regulated and silence imposed on them." He called for greater transparency, saying that it is not transparency that damages the church, but its lack, and covering up.

In December 2020 Marx called the Archdiocese of Cologne's decision not to publish an investigation into clergy sexual abuse as 'devastating' for the entire church. In a newspaper interview, Marx said "the public now perceives that lawyers are quibbling over details on the backs of the victims". Marx promised that the Archdiocese of Munich would publish its own report on sexual abuse once it was finished in 2021, which would name those who were responsible and that it would not be about sparing his predecessors (Joseph Ratzinger and Friedrich Wetter).

Also in December 2020, Marx announced he would set up a charitable foundation in his diocese to help people who were affected by sexual abuse in the church and that he would be giving the vast majority of his private assets, which totaled 500,000 Euros, to the foundation.

In February 2021, Marx was accused in a report published by Deutschlandfunk of mishandling a case in the Diocese of Trier that said he had investigated a priest who had gotten a parish employee pregnant around 2000 but not a second priest who, in the confessional, had advised her to have an abortion. Marx confessed this error to the Congregation for Clergy in 2007.

Also in the same month, Christian Pfeiffer, a German criminologist who had been hired by the German Bishops' Conference in 2011 to investigate sex abuse, accused Marx of denying his team access to some key documents. He had similar criticisms a year before. He alleged that Marx was trying to protect Pope Benedict, himself as well as other German church leaders. Marx rejected the allegations as baseless.

Sex abuse victims, in April 2021, urged German President Frank-Walter Steinmeier not to go ahead with plans to award Marx with the Knight Commander's Cross of the Order of Merit of the Federal Republic of Germany on grounds of his alleged mishandling of sex abuse cases in the past. Peter Bringmann-Henselder who represented sex abuse victims and was himself a recipient of the same award said he would give back his award if Marx was awarded. Marx responded by declining the award and said: "I take very seriously the criticism now being leveled by people dealing with sexual abuse in the Church, regardless of the correctness of the individual statements in open letters and in the media" and said he would not ignore the criticism.

While Marx has not been directly implicated in any wrongdoing regarding the Church sexual abuse crisis, he said that all members of the hierarchy bear some responsibility for it, and that it has led to a credibility crisis among Church leadership. Marx said that the Church has reached a "dead end" regarding the sex abuse crisis and hopes that his resignation would be "a personal signal for a new beginning, for a new awakening of the Church, not only in Germany."

In May 2021 Marx sent a letter to Pope Francis offering to resign as archbishop. Marx wrote, "I have to share responsibility for the catastrophe of sexual abuse by officials of the church over past decades". Marx wrote further there were, "a lot of personal failure and administrative errors" and also, "institutional and systemic failure" and Marx wrote as well, "I would like to make it clear that I am ready to take personal responsibility, not only for my own mistakes but for the church as an institution which I have helped to shape over the decades." The Archdiocese of Munich stated that Pope Francis had allowed Marx to make his resignation letter public, and asked him to remain in his role until he had received an answer. A law firm commissioned by the archdiocese to investigate historic sexual abuse allegations is set to release its report shortly after the letter became public. On 10 June 2021, in a lengthy letter addressed to Marx, Pope Francis informed him that he should continue as Archbishop of Munich and Freising.

In July 2021, Marx visited a parish in Garching an der Alz in his diocese where a priest accused of abuse of minors had been stationed prior to Marx's becoming Archbishop. A spokesman for the Catholic reform movement 'We are Church' commented that the visit was 'a concrete opportunity to demonstrate his pastoral commitment as a pastor and to work for the spiritual renewal of the Church – as he offered in his resignation and as Pope Francis then instructed him in his refusal'.

Marx suggested in July 2021 that he might offer a second resignation. He said: "I do not understand my service as a bishop as an office that belongs to me and that I have to defend, but as a mission for the people of this archdiocese and as a service to the unity of the Church" and "Should I no longer be able to fulfill this ministry, then it would be time — after consultation with the diocesan bodies and also the abuse appraisal commission and the affected persons’ advisory board — to decide for the good of the Church and offer my resignation from office once again."

An ecclesiastical document cited by German media in January 2022 criticized Cardinal Marx for failing to remove a Chaplain cited as 'Peter H' from the priesthood in the late 2000s. The same document also faulted former Pope Benedict XVI for failing with regard to the same priest while he served as Archbishop of Munich.

It was reported in November 2021 that the Munich law firm Westpfahl Spilker Wastl had been investigating Cardinal Marx and several other bishops as part of a report on sexual abuse in the Archdiocese of Munich and Freising due to be published in 2022. They published their report on 20 January 2022. In the report, Cardinal Marx was accused of mishandling two cases of sex abuse in the archdiocese. Following the release, he made a statement: "My first thought today is for those affected by sexual abuse, who have experienced harm and suffering at the hands of Church representatives, priests, and other employees in the sphere of the Church, on an appalling scale. I am shocked and ashamed." Martin Pusch one of the authors of the report, alleged that Marx had said the main responsibility for handling abuse cases belonged to archdiocese's ordinariate and vicariate general. Push questioned Marx's position by saying: 'When, if not in the case of the sexual abuse of minors, is the classification of an issue as a ‘matter for the boss’ applicable?'. Marion Westpfahl one of the founding partners of the law firm, also lamented that Cardinal Marx was absent for the presentation of the report.

In the aftermath of the report by the law firm, Marx said he would not attempt to make another resignation as he had done the previous year and said that: "I am ready to continue serving if that is helpful for the further steps that have to be taken for a more reliable reappraisal, even more attention to those affected and for reform of the church". However, he also said that if he found that his continued presence was more of a hindrance than a help that he would step aside. He also pointed at the report and said that what they saw in it was a disaster, and he repeated calls that the church needed deep reform, including the 'synodal path' that would open up debate within the church about issues the church faced including homosexuality, priestly celibacy and the role of women. He said, 'Anyone who still denies systemic causes and opposes a necessary reform of the church in its stances and structures hasn't understood the challenge.'

Cardinal Marx held a meeting on 21 March 2022, in Munich with abuse victims. He mentioned on the occasion that the issues regarding the abuse related to systemic and deep issues within the church that needed to be addressed.

An interim report published in August 2022 by an independent commission investigating sexual abuse in the diocese of Trier was criticized for failing to mention a case in which accusations of breach of duty against Reinhard Marx, when he was bishop of Trier.

In January 2023, on the one-year anniversary of the publication of the report on sexual abuse in the Munich archdiocese, Marx commented, "I will always be responsible for the suffering that this entails and I therefore apologize again...I can’t undo what happened, but I can act differently now and in the future. And I’m doing that."

In May 2023, a group of German abuse survivors went by bicycle from Germany to Rome to press the Pope on church sex abuse; the group travelled with Cardinal Marx's support.

In July 2024, it was reported that at the annual reception for the Archbishopric in Munich, Marx emphasized the church's need to uncover and handling past abuse cases was necessary for rebuilding trust in the church.

In October 2025, a report was published that documented church abuse in the Diocese of Trier, including the time when Marx served as bishop. Marx accepted the report and criticized his own actions at the time for being inadequate in dealing with the problem.

Marx expressed opposition to the appointment of Munich priest Wolfgang Rothe to an advisory council for victims of abuse, on account of Rothe's alleged homosexual relationship with a seminarian from decades prior.

== Books ==
In October 2008 Marx published Das Kapital: A Plea for the Human Being. He described it as "an argument with Marxism". It opened with a letter addressed to Karl Marx: "The consequences of your thinking were disastrous." Contrary to his namesake's prediction of the inevitable collapse of capitalism, he proposed an important role for the Church in the survival of a healthy form of capitalism: "Capitalism without humanity, solidarity and justice has no morals and no future."

== Bibliography ==
- Reinhard Marx, Ist Kirche anders? : Möglichkeiten und Grenzen einer soziologischen Betrachtungsweise, Schöningh, Paderborn [etc.], 1990. OCLC 1203449867 (thesis, dissertation)

Catholic Church titles
Preceded by Rafael Palmero Ramos	— TITULAR — Titular Bishop of Pićan; 23 July 1996 – 20 December 2001	Succeeded by Valentin Pozaić
Preceded by Hermann Josef Spital	Bishop of Trier; 20 December 2001 – 30 November 2007	Succeeded by Stephan Ackermann
Preceded by Friedrich Wetter	Archbishop of Munich and Freising; 30 November 2007 –	Incumbent
Preceded by Piotr Jarecki	Vice-President of the Commission of the Bishops' Conferences of the European Community; 18 March 2009 – 22 March 2012	Succeeded by Jean Kockerols
Titular church established	Cardinal-Priest of San Corbiniano; 20 November 2010 –	Incumbent
Preceded by Adrianus Herman van Luyn	President of the Commission of the Bishops' Conferences of the European Community; 22 March 2012 – 8 March 2018	Succeeded by Jean-Claude Hollerich
Office established	Coordinator of the Council for the Economy; 8 March 2014 –	Incumbent
Preceded by Robert Zollitsch	President of the German Episcopal Conference; 12 March 2014 – 3 March 2020	Succeeded by Georg Bätzing
