= Martin Strahammer =

WW2 German Army general (1890-1945)

- Born: 13 November 1890; Gösting, Zistersdorf, Austria-Hungary
- Died: 2 May 1945 (aged 54); Parma, Italy
- Military career
- Allegiance: Nazi Germany
- Branch: Army (Wehrmacht)
- Rank: Oberstleutnant (Austria); Generalmajor (Germany)
- Commands: 114th Jäger Division
- Conflicts: World War I; World War II; Invasion of Poland; Battle of France; Operation Barbarossa; Siege of Sevastopol (1941–1942); Siege of Leningrad; Battle of Anzio; Operation Diadem; Gothic Line Offensive; Italian Spring Offensive (executed)
- Awards: Knight's Cross of the Iron Cross with Oak Leaves

Martin Strahammer (13 November 1890 – 2 May 1945) was an Austrian general in the armed forces of Nazi Germany during World War II. He was a recipient of the Knight's Cross of the Iron Cross with Oak Leaves. Following his surrender, he was shot by American forces on 2 May 1945 at Parma under unclear circumstances.

== Awards and decorations ==
- Iron Cross (1914) 2nd Class (8 September 1917)
- Iron Cross (1939) 2nd Class (4 July 1941) & 1st Class (5 August 1941)
- German Cross in Gold on 11 March 1943 as Oberst in Grenadier-Regiment 266
- Knight's Cross of the Iron Cross with Oak Leaves
  - Knight's Cross on 30 January 1942 as Oberstleutnant and commander of Panzer-Jäger-Abteilung 240
  - Oak Leaves on 11 August 1944 as Oberst and commander of Grenadier-Regiment 146

Military offices
Preceded by Generalmajor Hans-Joachim Ehlert	Commander of 114. Jäger Division; 15 April 1945 – 23 April 1945	Succeeded by None
