= San Corbiniano =

- Saint Corbinian's (in English); Sancti Corbiniani (in Latin)
- Click on the map for a fullscreen view
- 41°44′54″N 12°22′37″E
- Location: Infernetto, Rome
- Country: Italy
- Denomination: Catholic
- Tradition: Roman Rite
- Website: Official website

History
- Status: Titular church
- Dedication: Corbinian

Architecture
- Architect: Umberto Riva
- Architectural type: Church

Administration
- Province: Diocese of Rome

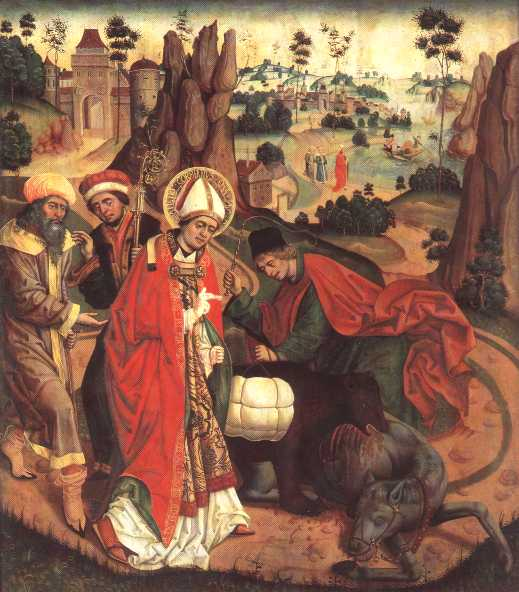
Painting of Saint Corbinian

San Corbiniano is a 21st-century Titular church for a Cardinal-priest and a parish church (in full San Corbiniano all'Infernetto) in southern Rome's XXVIIth prefecture.

== Church ==
Its address is Via Ermanno Wolf Ferrari 201, Infernetto, Roma, Lazio 00124, near Via Erik Satie. The parish, in the Pope's own Diocese of Rome, was founded as Parish of S. Guglielmo al Laurentino on 1989.10.20 and renamed on 20 June 2008.

The parish church was dedicated to Saint Corbinian on 20 March 2011.

It enjoyed a papal visit from Pope Benedict XVI on 20 March 2011.

== Cardinal title ==
The titulus Sancti Corbiniani, for Cardinal-priests, was established on 20 November 2010.

=== Cardinal-protectors ===
The following Cardinal-priests have been its cardinal-protector :

- Reinhard Marx (20 November 2010 – present)

== Sources and external links ==
- GCatholic the cardinal title
- GCatholic the church
- Parochial website (in Italian)
