= Stephan Ackermann =

German bishop

The Most Reverend Stephan Ackermann
- Bishop of Trier
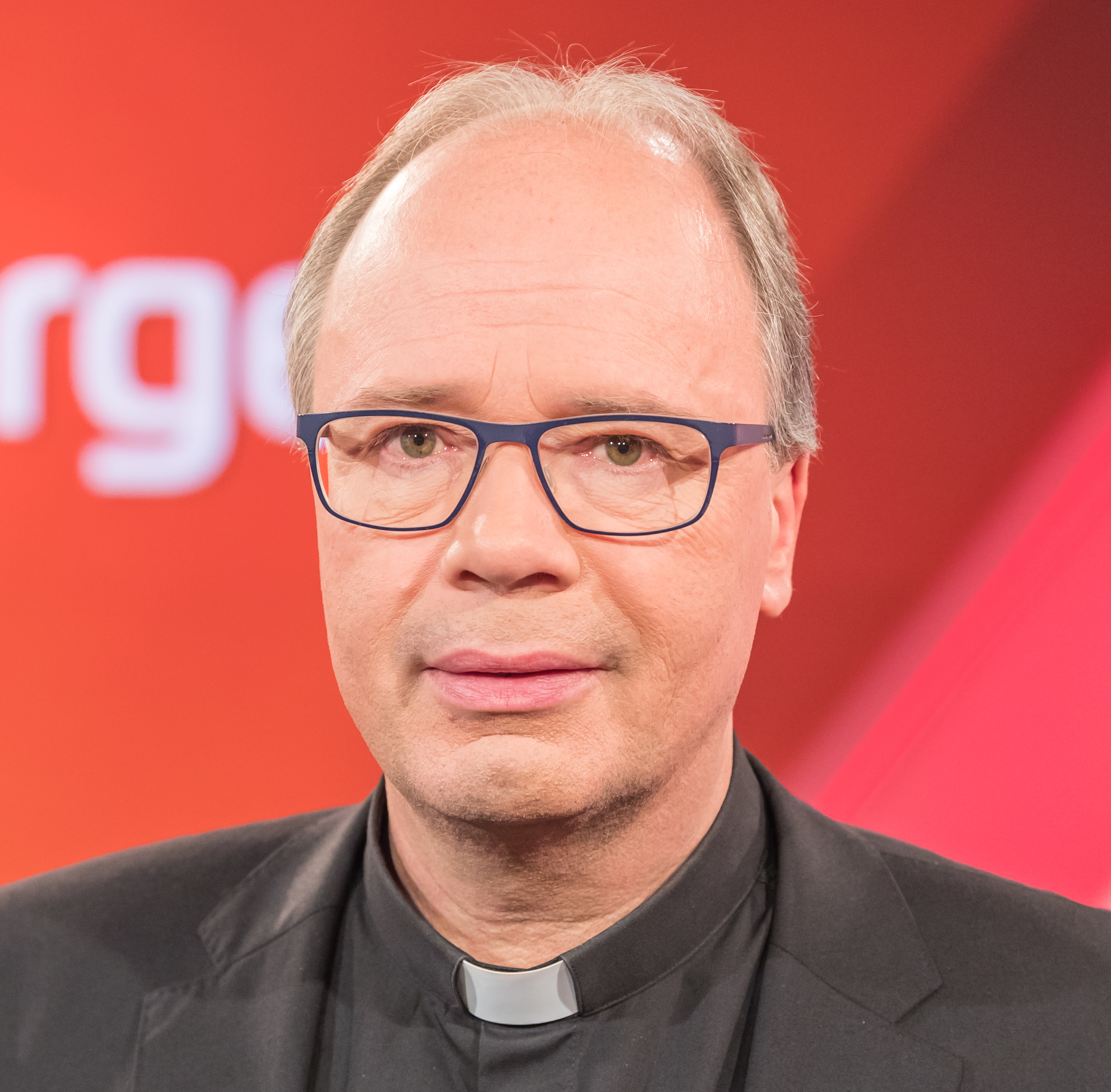
- Church: Roman Catholic
- Diocese: Diocese of Trier
- Appointed: 8 April 2009
- Installed: 24 May 2009
- Predecessor: Reinhard Marx

Orders
- Ordination: 10 October 1987 by Georg Moser
- Consecration: 14 May 2009 by Reinhard Marx

Personal details
- Born: 20 March 1963 (age 63) Mayen, Rhineland-Palatinate, West Germany
- Motto: In Lumine Tuo Domine
- Coat of arms: Stephan Ackermann's coat of arms

Stephan Ackermann (born 20 March 1963) is a German bishop. He was elected by the Cathedral Chapter as Bishop of Trier in the Moselle area of Germany in 2009.

== Early life ==
The son of Helmy and Hermann and the eldest of two children, Ackermann grew up in Nickenich. His father was a church books and souvenirs merchant and met his mother when she was working as a sales assistant in the Maria Laach Abbey gift shop. He has a sister named Bärbel and is the godfather of two of her children. Ackerman was educated at secondary school level in Andernach.

== Formation and Priesthood ==
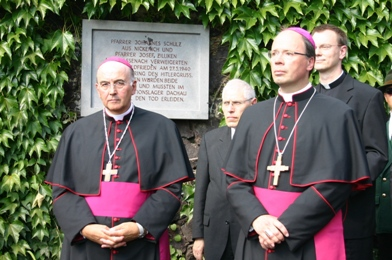
Bishop of Münster Felix Genn and Bishop Stephen Ackermann during the unveiling of a commemorative plaque for the martyr priests in 2010.

He entered the Trier priest seminary at the age of 18 and studied at the Gregorian and Sankt Georgen higher education ecclesiastical schools. He was ordained a priest in 1987.

From 1989 to 1991, Ackerman was a chaplain in Bad Breisig in the catholic parishes of Niederbreisig and Oberbreisig. In 1991 he returned to his seminary to be appointed chancellor for 8 years. Ackermann would then replace the newly appointed auxiliary bishop of Trier Felix Genn as the director of St. Lambert priest seminary and in 2000 he received an ecclesiastical doctorate in church dogmatics by Jesuit Fr. Medard Kehl. His dissertation "Church as a Person" was followed by the book "In Action for the Church", a series of essays co-authored with Felix Genn in dialogue with the former Jesuit leader Johannes Günter Gerhartz. In November 2005 he received the title of monsignor by the Holy See. The certificate was handed to him by the then Trier Bishop Reinhard Marx who appointed him auxiliary bishop 6 months later.

=== Bishop of Trier ===
Ackermann became Reinhard Marx's successor as Bishop of Trier in 2009. Until the ordination of Bishop of Passau in 2014, Ackermann was Germany's youngest bishop. Days after his ordination, his biography, authored by the press office of the Diocese, was released. The illustrated biography included images from his recent episcopal ordination and proclaimed a transition to a new period for the Diocese.

Ackermann appointed the South African Eifel priest Stefan Hippler in the archdiocese of Cape Town; Hippler where he would be involved in the development and expansion of aid projects for AIDS-infected people – on behalf of the local archbishop. In the German Bishops' Conference, he became chairman of the Liturgy Commission and the Universal Church Commission. [8]

==== Child Abuse Controversy ====
While being the German Bishops Conference's spokesman on child abuse issues he encouraged victims of child abuse to come forward, but later neglected actively to pursue investigations or impose harsh penalties. Ackermann had to issue a public apology after failing to immediately suspend a suspected paedophile priest in 2011 yet ignored press revelations about seven other cases of priests in the bishop's diocese who are suspected of having abused minors. In January 2011, the police informed his office that a pastor from Saarbrücken, the state capital, had allegedly abused minors. According to the guidelines of the German Bishops' Conference, prompt action had to be taken in such suspected cases, and the priest in question could be suspended until the accusations had been cleared up; nevertheless, despite these guidelines, and despite his status as the Church's spokesman on abuse issues, Ackermann allowed one suspected paedophile to remain in office. The priest continued to celebrate Mass and even held a dedication ceremony for a Catholic kindergarten in the summer. In the fall, another ceremony was held to mark his 70th birthday.

==== Diocesan Synod ====
On 29 June 2012, Bishop Ackermann proclaimed a diocesan synod that was constituted on 13 and 14 December 2013. It was the first synod in the diocese of Trier for almost 50 years.

==== Reform of Sexual Morality ====
In 2014, Ackermann said that the Roman Catholic Church should reform Roman Catholic sexual ethics. Same-sex marriages should be accepted and not be described as immoral

==== Parish Abolishment and Clergy Role Reformation Plan ====
Bishop Ackermann has announced that the diocese will be closing almost all of its parishes, reducing 903 parishes and all relevant organizations to 35 new regional authorities. The parishes of the future will have nothing in common with the parish concept "but the name". The new entities will include limitation to the duties of the clergy and the introduction of new duties for the laity. According to Ackermann's plan, laypeople will have the right to make decisions and lead "traditional and new worship forms" and "there'll continue to be a priest who takes overall responsibility, but tasks and duties will also be distributed by the team – so there'll be less emphasis on the clergy's leadership and more on its priestly and pastoral functions".

In 2017, Ackermann became the president of the Liturgy Commission of the German Bishop's Conference. Bishop Ackermann in 2017 also called for the abolition of nuclear weapons at the Buchel airfield.
