= Matthias Defregger =

German priest

Coat of arms of Matthias Defregger.

Matthias Defregger (February 18, 1915 – July 23, 1995) was a former Catholic auxiliary bishop of Munich and Freising. He was also controversially considered responsible for a wartime atrocity in World War II.

== Life ==
Matthias was born in Munich in 1915. He was the grandson of the Austrian artist Franz Defregger. His father was a sculptor. He studied philosophy at the Stella Matutina in Austria.

== World War II ==
He was drafted into the German army prior to the war, but voluntarily stayed on after his mandatory service ended and he became an officer. He fought both in the German invasion of Poland and the war on the eastern front against the Soviet Union.

In 1944, he was stationed in Italy, where he had command of an intelligence unit within the 114th division. Partisans attacked and killed at least one German soldier in his company. The division commander ordered Defregger to shoot local men of military age in retribution. Defregger claimed that he resisted the order at first, but eventually carried it out by giving the order to shoot 17 local men from the area of Filetto di Camarda and to burn the village.

== Priesthood and Episcopate ==
Following the war, he pursued a calling to the priesthood and was ordained in 1949. He served as a priest within the Munich archdiocese. He was instrumental in the hosting of the 37th Eucharistic Congress in Munich in 1960. In 1962, he was appointed by Julius Cardinal Döpfner as Vicar-general of the archdiocese. He attended the Second Vatican Council as an assistant to Cardinal Döpfner.

In 1968 he was appointed by Paul VI as auxiliary bishop of Munich and Freising. He took the motto 'Servant of All' (Omnium Servus). He was known to give reunion masses for his former comrades in the 114th division. On one occasion he preached, "What the dust of the Russian steppes, the fields of the Caucasus, what the bursting of the grenades have wrought ... will withstand the pragmatic materialism of our time".

In 1969, however, the atrocity his unit committed in Italy came to light when it was published by the German Der Spiegel newspaper. Der Spiegel also reported that the Frankfurt Crime Department had also investigated Defregger on suspicion of wartime murder the previous year. Dietrich Rahn, Frankfurt's chief prosecutor, claimed that Defregger may have been guilty of manslaughter for his role in carrying out the atrocity, however, the German statute of limitations for manslaughter had already passed by that point. Cardinal Döpfner shocked many Catholics when he admitted that he had always known about Defregger's past, but he defended him, alleging that Defregger had tried to resist the order and that failing to carry it out would have meant his own execution.

Legal proceedings were carried out against him in 1969 and 1970, but ultimately dropped. In 1981, an assassination attempt was made on him.

He retired in 1990, but continued to preach up to his death in 1995.
