= Mohammed V Square =

Public square in Casablanca

- Town square
- ساحة محمد الخامس
- Nicknames: Pigeon Square (ساحة الحمام)
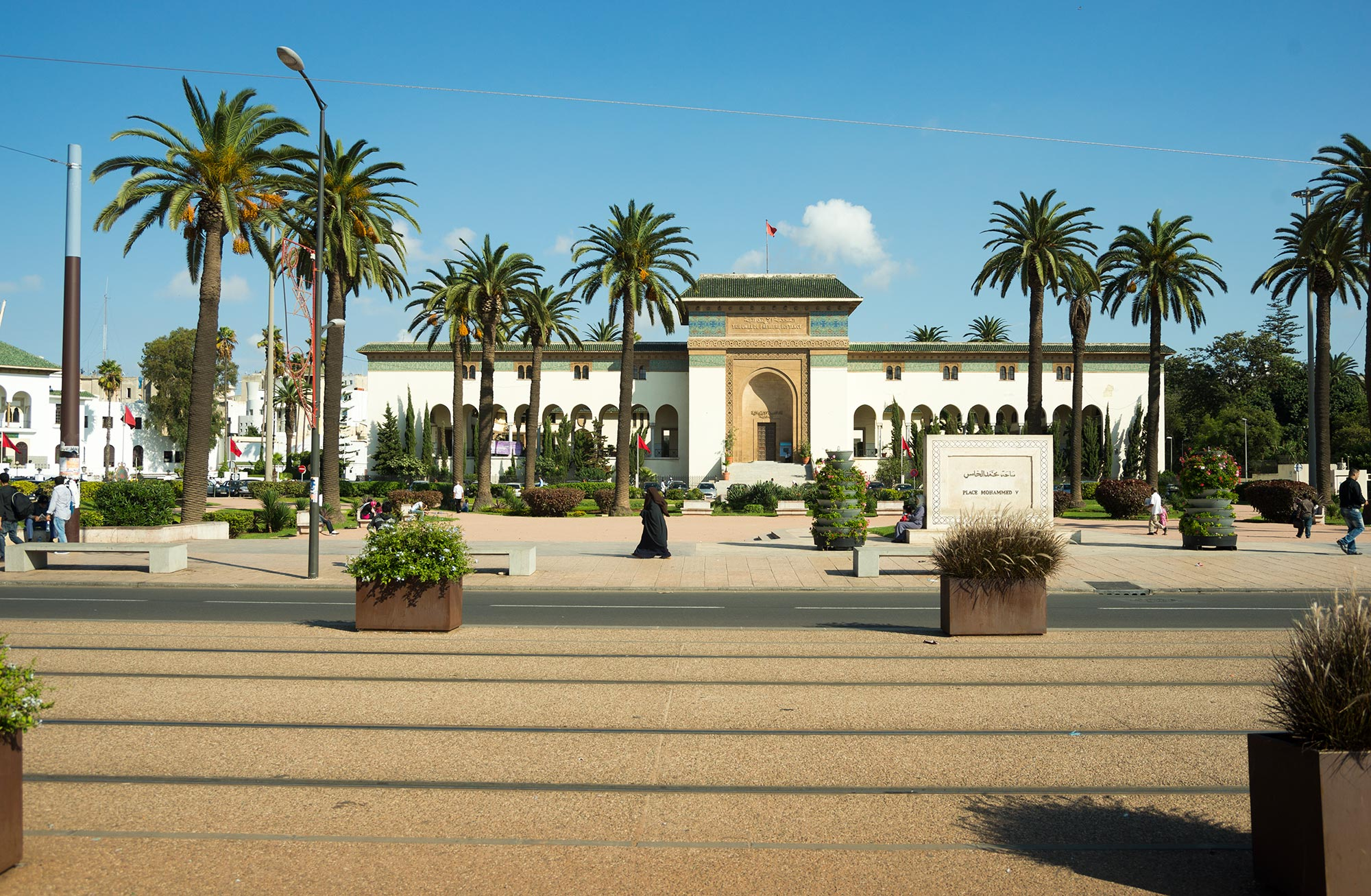
- Mohammed V Square looking toward the Court of First Instance
- Interactive map of Mohammed V Square
- Coordinates: 33.5912°N 7.6187°W

Mohammed V Square (Arabic: ساحة محمد الخامس) is a public square of historical and symbolic significance located in central Casablanca, Morocco. It was established in 1916 at the beginning of the French protectorate in Morocco under Resident-general Hubert Lyautey, on a design by architects Henri Prost and Joseph Marrast.

== Name ==
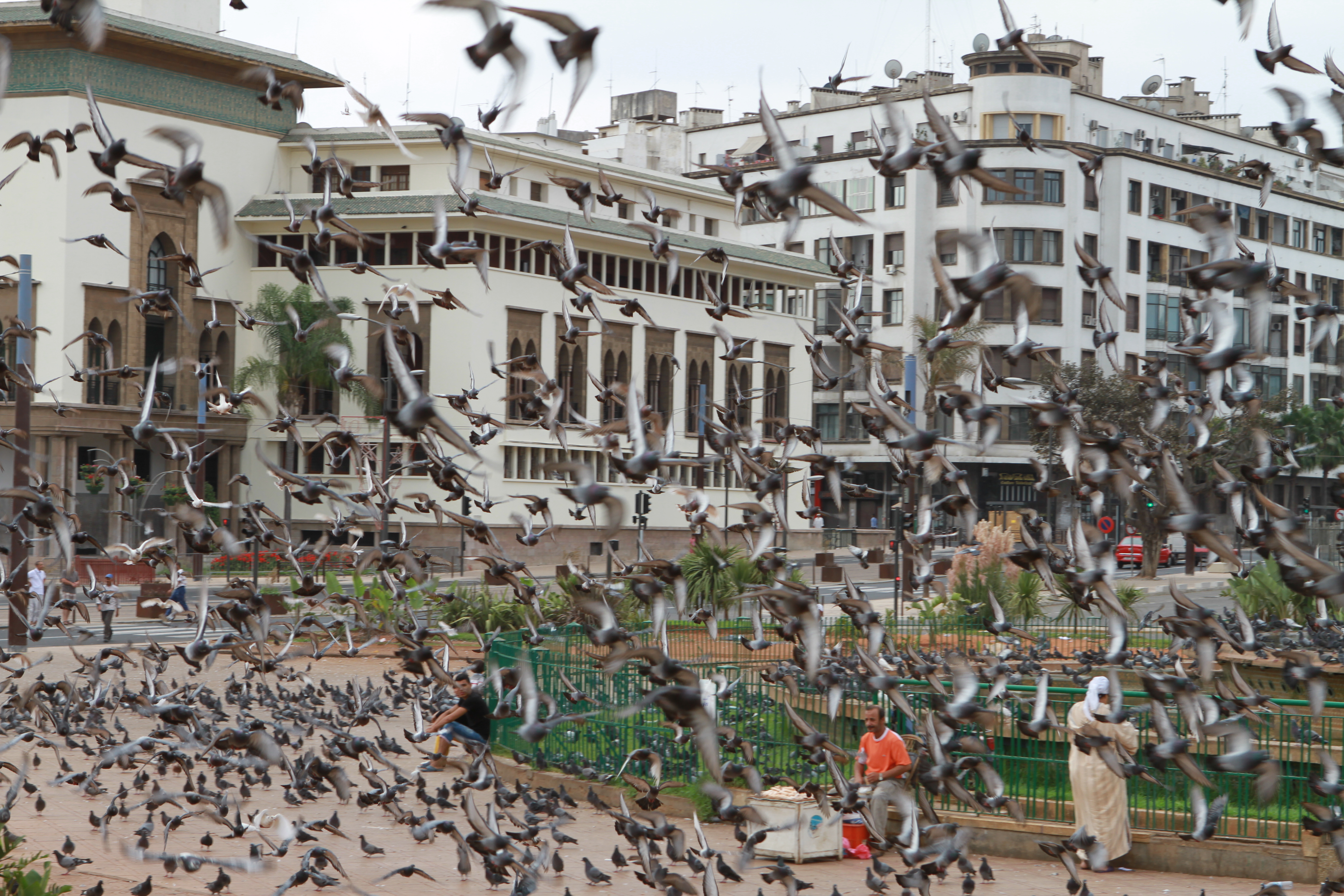
Pigeons on Mohammed V Square in 2012, before the latest renovation works

The square is known officially as Mohammed V Square, in honor of the former king of Morocco Mohammed V. The square is known popularly as "Pigeons' Square" (ساحة الحمام, French: place aux pigeons) due to the heavy presence of those birds. It used to be known by different names such as Main Square (French: grande place), Square of France (French: place de France), Victory Square (French: place de la Victoire), Administrative Square (French: place administrative), and Marshal Lyautey Square (French: place du Maréchal Lyautey).

== History ==
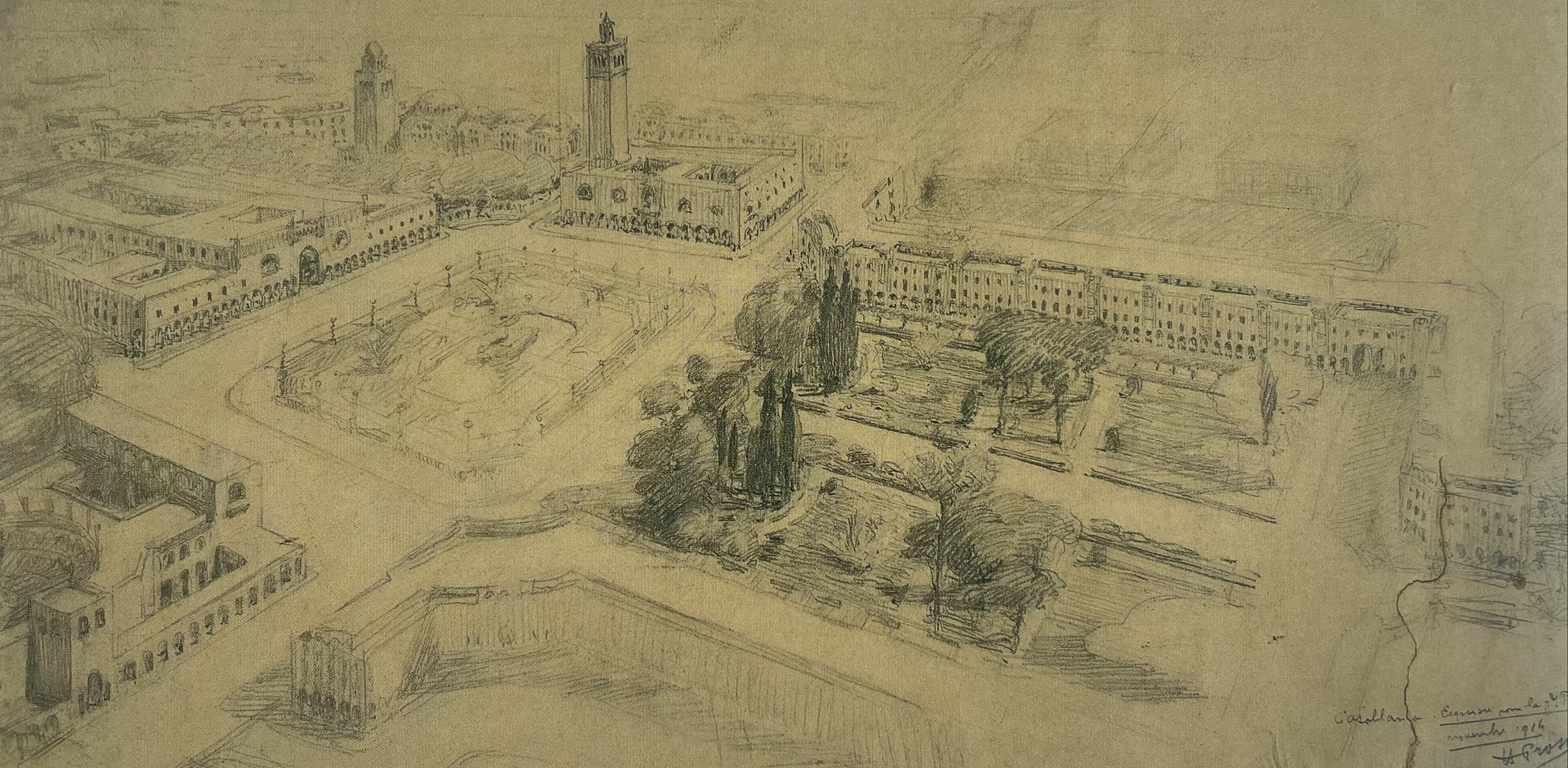
Henri Prost's preliminary sketch of the Place Administrative, November 1914

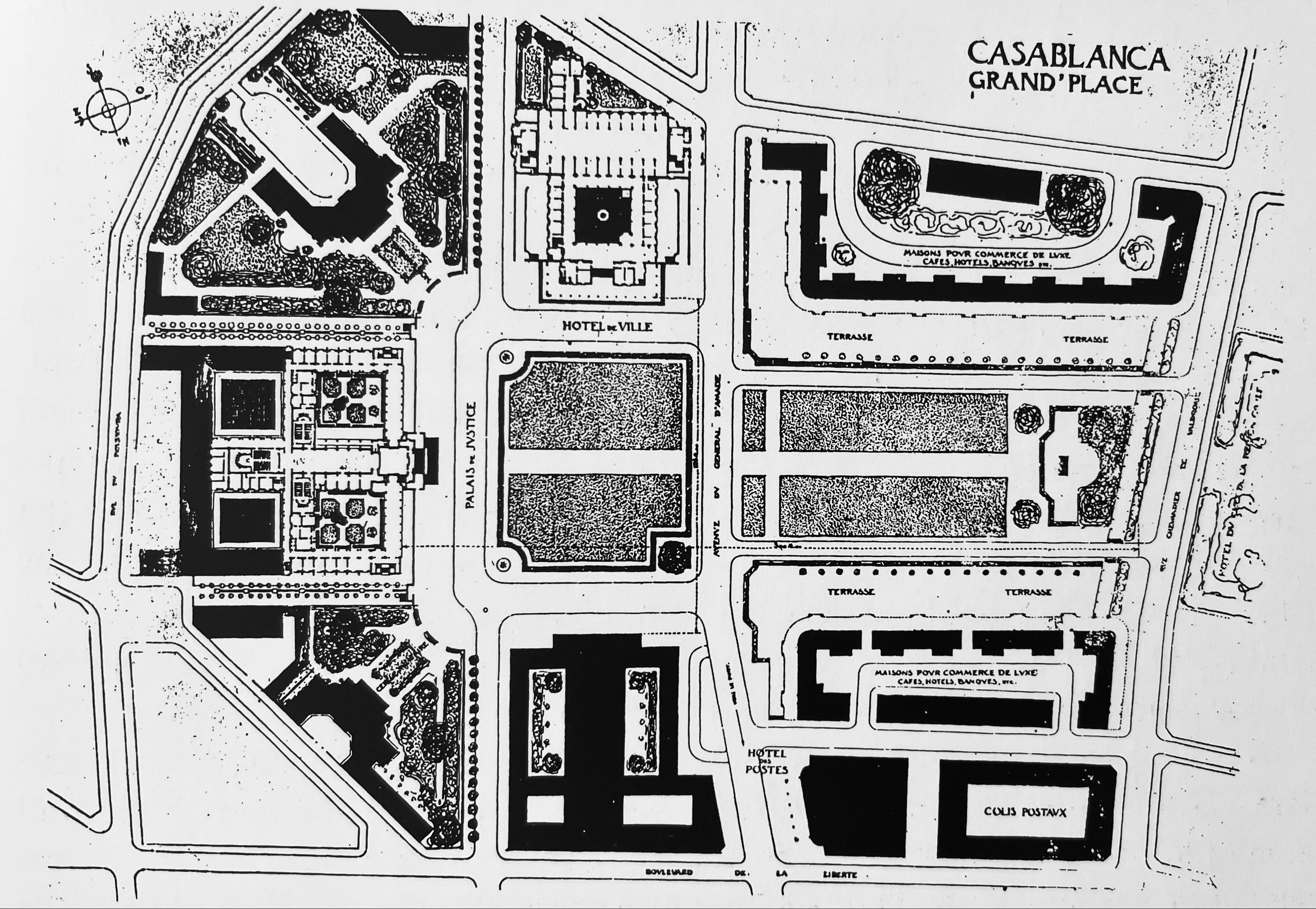
Joseph Marrast's general plan for the Place Administrative, 1920

The area south of the Medina quarter that is now Mohammed V Square had been occupied by barracks of the French colonial forces before the plan of Henri Prost and Joseph Marrast to establish a large square there was implemented in 1916. It became the heart of the expanding "European city" (ville européenne) or modern expansion of Casablanca. Resident-general Hubert Lyautey, who was from Nancy, France, had that city's 18th-century Place Stanislas serve as inspiration for Prost's urban design.

Buildings were erected around the square in the 1920s and 1930s, generally in the Moorish Revival architecture style championed by Henri Prost and his contemporaries. This style combined French design principles with traditional Mauro-Andalusian architectural traditions, which lent the colonial administrative buildings legitimacy. Clockwise from the square's eastern side:

- Court House (المحكمة, tribunal de première instance), architect Joseph Marrast, 1923
- Place d'Armes de Casablanca (former Military Circle, repurposed in 1956), architect Marius Boyer, 1925
- Bank Al-Maghrib (بنك المغرب, formerly the State Bank of Morocco's Casablanca branch), architect Edmond Brion, 1937
- Central Post Office (مكتب البريد, Grande Poste), architect Adrien Laforgue, 1920
- Wilaya Building (مقر الولاية, formerly City Hall), architect Marius Boyer, 1937
- French consulate-general (former Military Commander's Mansion, repurposed in 1956), architect Albert Laprade, 1922

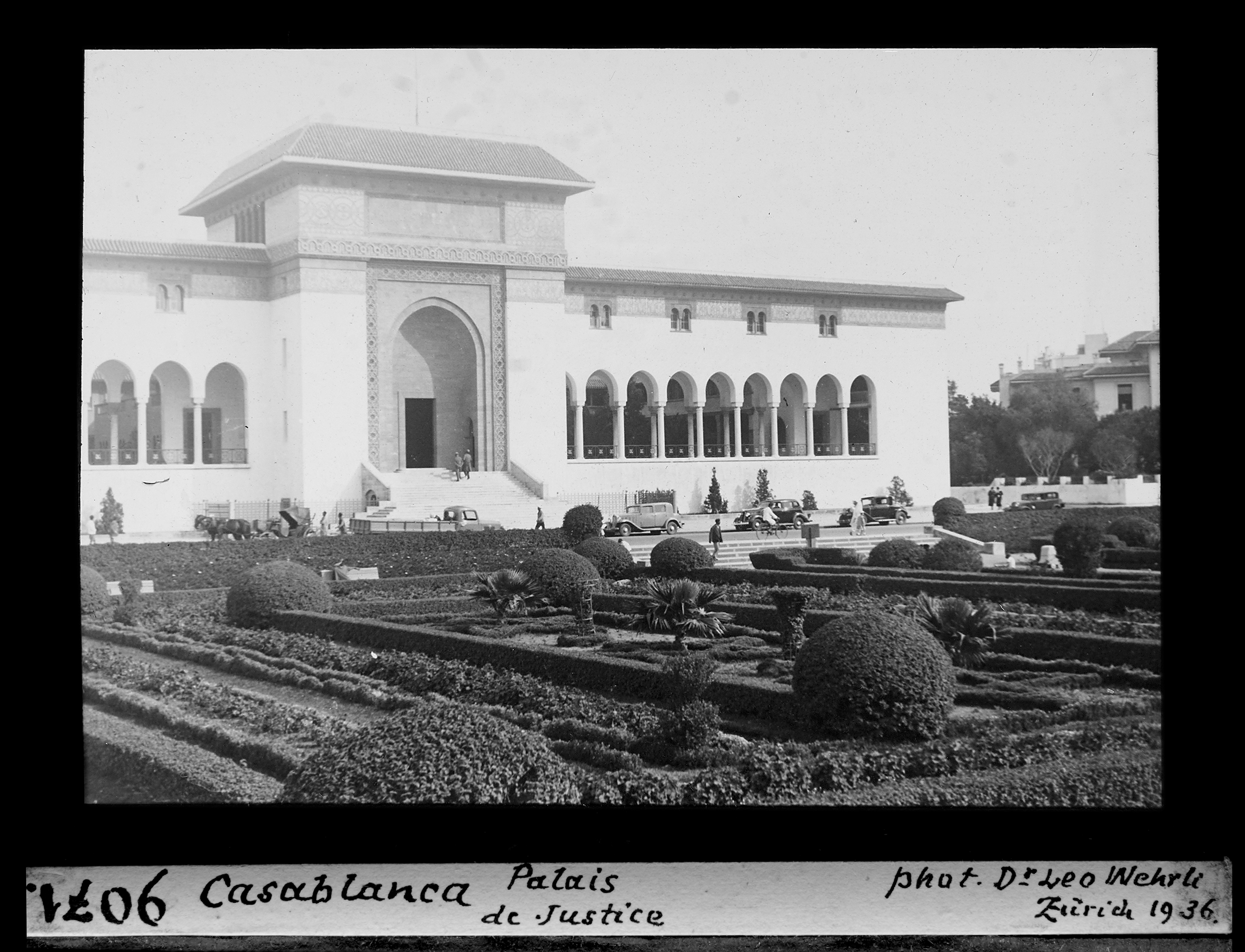
The Palais de Justice overlooking the gardens in 1936 in what is now Mohammed V Square.

On August 8, 1943, Charles de Gaulle, accompanied by General Georges Catroux, commissary of the Coordination of Muslim Affairs and governor general of Algeria, and Gabriel Puaux, resident general of France in Morocco, delivered a speech from the square, which was also broadcast by radio.

The square was further transformed in 2020 with the construction on its western side of the Grand Theatre (French: Grand Théâtre de Casablanca), designed by architect Christian de Portzamparc. On that occasion the square was entirely renovated and repaved.

== Monuments and fountain ==
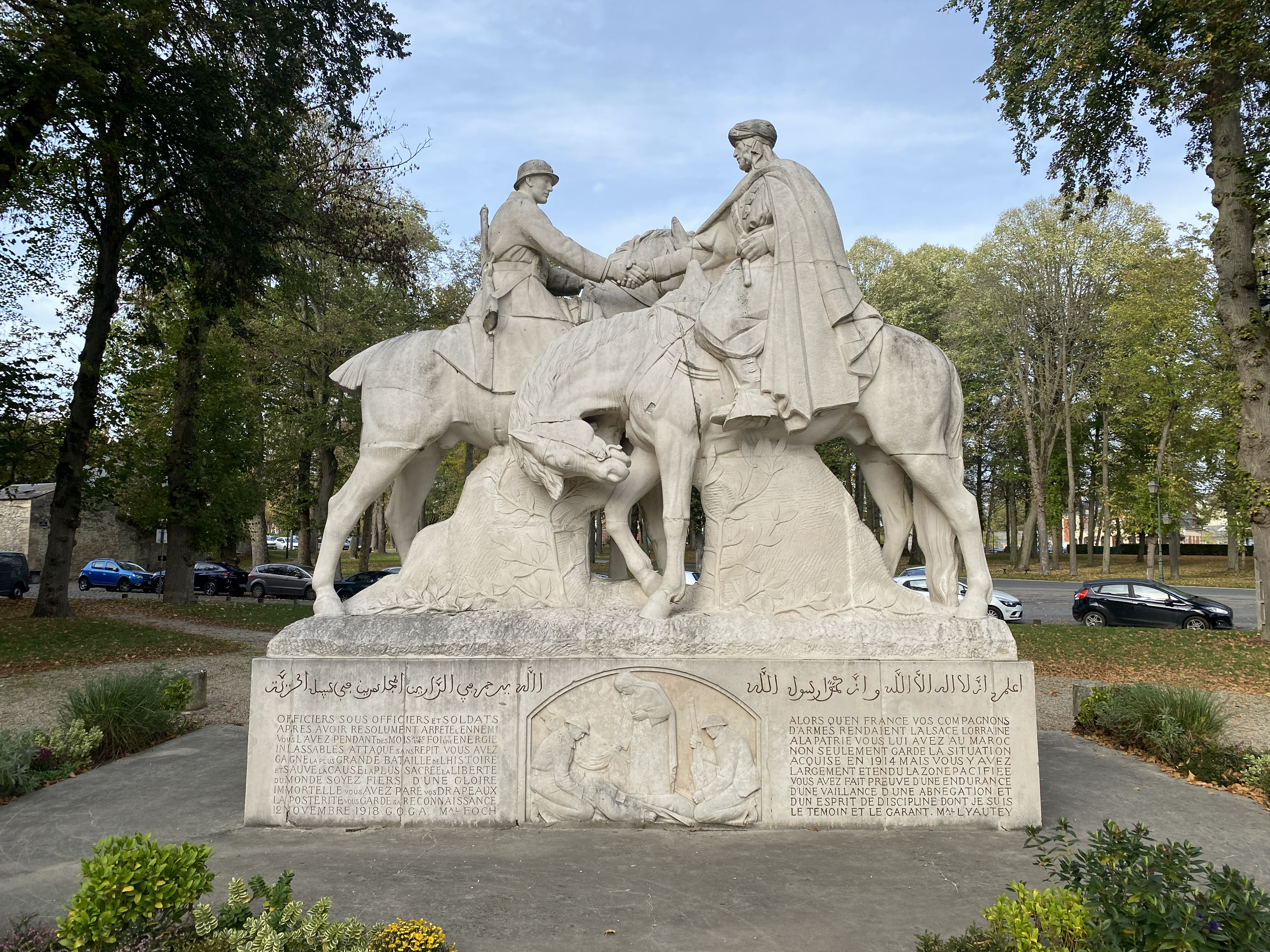
The former Monument aux Morts, re-erected in 1965 in Senlis

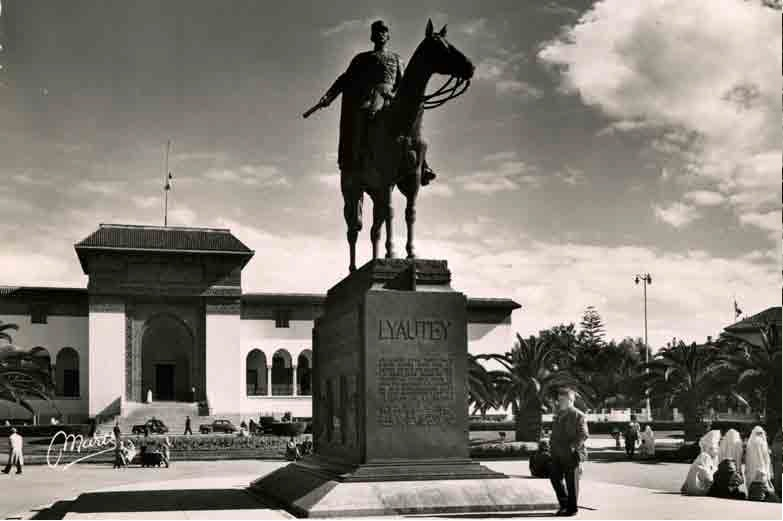
Equestrian statue of Hubert Lyautey, before relocation on the grounds of the French consulate

During the colonial era, the square was punctuated by two major works of public sculpture: on the eastern end, the Monument aux Morts, officially named monument à la victoire et à la paix, sculpted by Paul Landowski and inaugurated by Resident-general Lyautey on 20 July 1924; and further west in front of the courthouse, the equestrian statue of Hubert Lyautey by François Cogné, inaugurated in 1938. The former was relocated to France in 1961 and reerected in 1965 as the monument de la fraternité franco-marocaine in Senlis; the latter was moved at the time of independence to French ground in the front yard of the nearby hôtel de la Subdivision militaire, which in 1959 became the French Consulate-general.

In 1976, a large circular fountain, also known as the “pigeons’ fountain” (French: fontaine aux pigeons), was erected at the center of the square, west of Hassan II Avenue. In 2020 with the construction of the Grand Theater on the square's western end, the much-liked fountain was relocated to the other side of the avenue, close to the original position of the Lyautey statue.

== See also ==
- United Nations Square (Casablanca)
- Arab League Park
- Avenue Mohammed V, Rabat
- Mohammed V of Morocco
