= Boufarik colonization monument =

Monument in Boufarik, Algeria, 1930–1962

The Boufarik colonization monument was a monument celebrating French colonization in Boufarik, Algeria. It was erected in 1930 and demolished in 1962.

== History ==
The monument was erected in 1930 to mark the 100th anniversary of the French Invasion of Algiers in 1830. Boufarik was chosen as its site because of its location at the heart of the fertile Mitidja plain, following a narrative according to which the region prosperous agriculture demonstrated the value of the colonization project.

The monument was designed by sculptors Henri Bouchard and Charles Bigonet with architect Xavier Salvador, in the Art Deco style that was dominant at the time. On 20 November 1929, their project won the design competition organized by the Conseil supérieur du centenaire that coordinated the centenary celebrations. It took the shape of a massive wall, 9 meters high and 45 meters wide, at the western end of Boufarik's main thoroughfare, now N61 road, whose eastern end was (and still is) the town's central church. On the wall stood an inscription in colossal capital letters, "[dedicated] to the French colonizing genius" (French: au génie colonisateur français), with a text in smaller letters beneath that read "to the heroes, to the pioneers of civilization, to the makers of greater France" (French: aux héros, aux pionniers de la civilisation, aux réalisateurs de la plus grande France). At the center stood a group of standing larger-than-life figures in high relief, representing military leaders Thomas Robert Bugeaud and Louis Juchault de Lamoricière; leading figures of the Mitidja colonization endeavor such as Pierre-Martin Borély de La Sapie, Maurice de Franclieu, Maximilien de Tonnac, Augustin de Vialar; and local pro-French leader Hadj Allal ben-Bouzéid ben Chaoua. Below them was a bas-relief frieze representing scenes from the rural life of the Mitidja.

The monument was inaugurated on 5 May 1930 by French President Gaston Doumergue, with numerous notables including Louis Franchet d'Espèrey attending.

It was entirely demolished in July 1962 following Algerian independence at the end of the Algerian War.

== See also ==
- Reformation Wall
- Memorial to the Liberation of Algeria
- Equestrian statue of Hubert Lyautey
