= François Cogné =

French sculptor

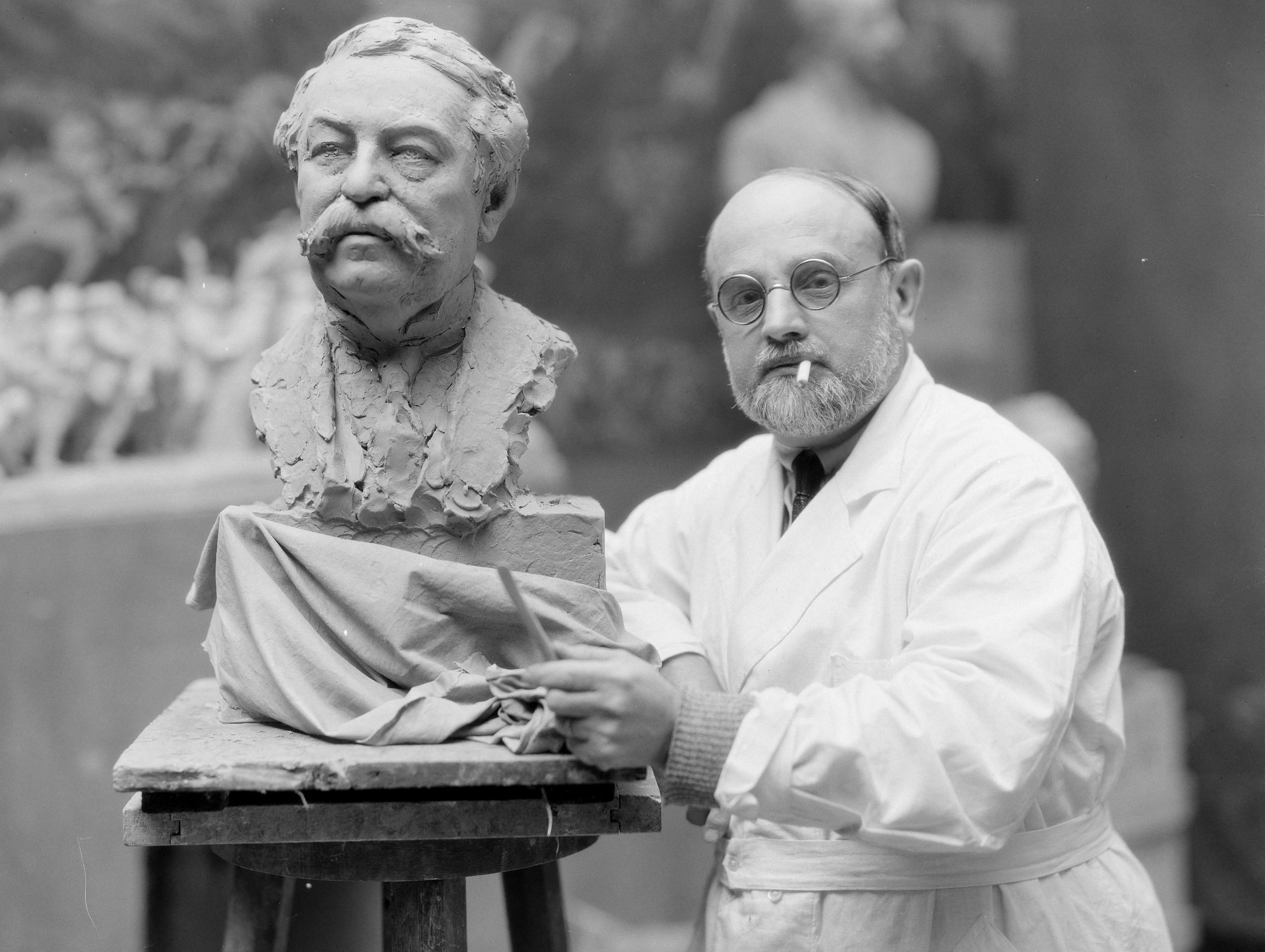
- Born: August 10, 1876
- Died: April 29, 1952 (aged 75)

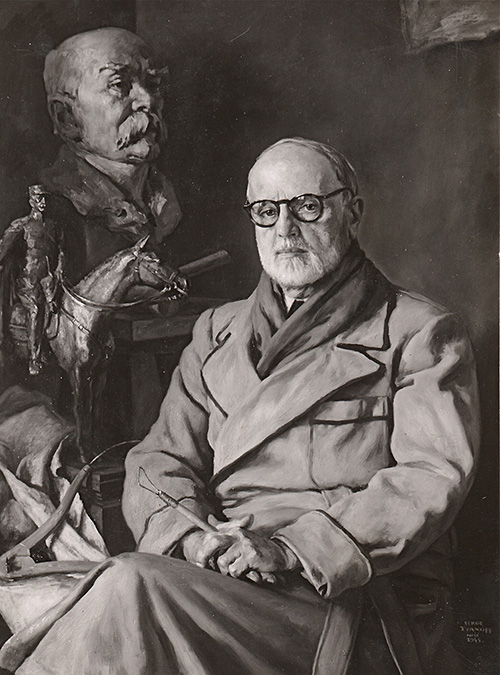
Portrait de François Cogné par Serge Ivanoff, Paris, 1945.

François Cogné (10 August 1876 – 9 April 1952) was a French sculptor. His work was part of the sculpture event in the art competition at the 1924 Summer Olympics.

He created an equestrian statue of Hubert Lyautey, the first French résident général in Morocco. It was first displayed at what in 1938 was Place Lyautey (now Muhammad V Square), though the statue is now kept within the walls of the French consulate in Casablanca.

He is credited, among other works, with the statue of Georges Clemenceau displayed on Champs Elysées.
