= Henri Bouchard =

French sculptor (1875–1960)

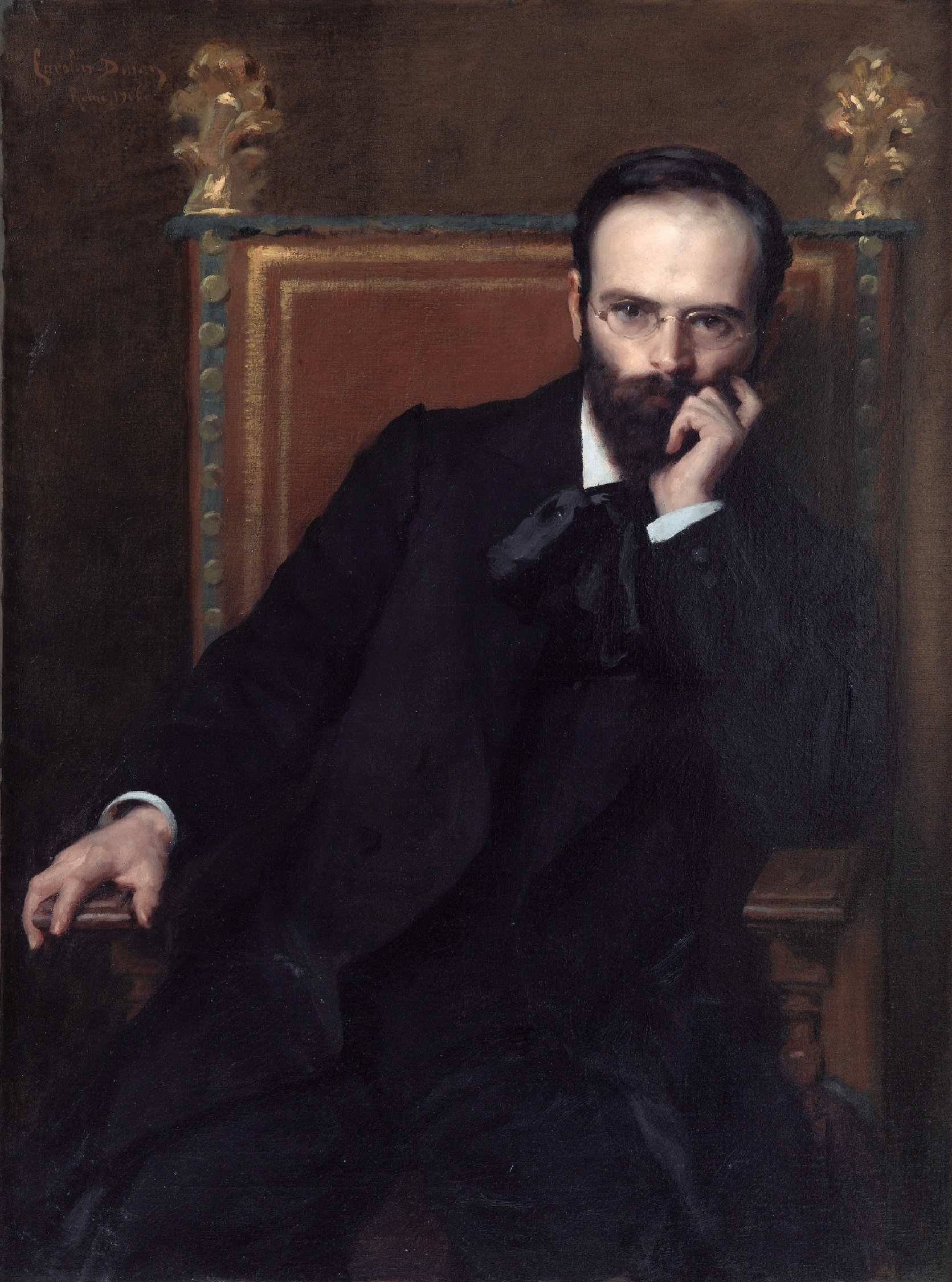
Henri Bouchard; portrait by Carolus-Duran.

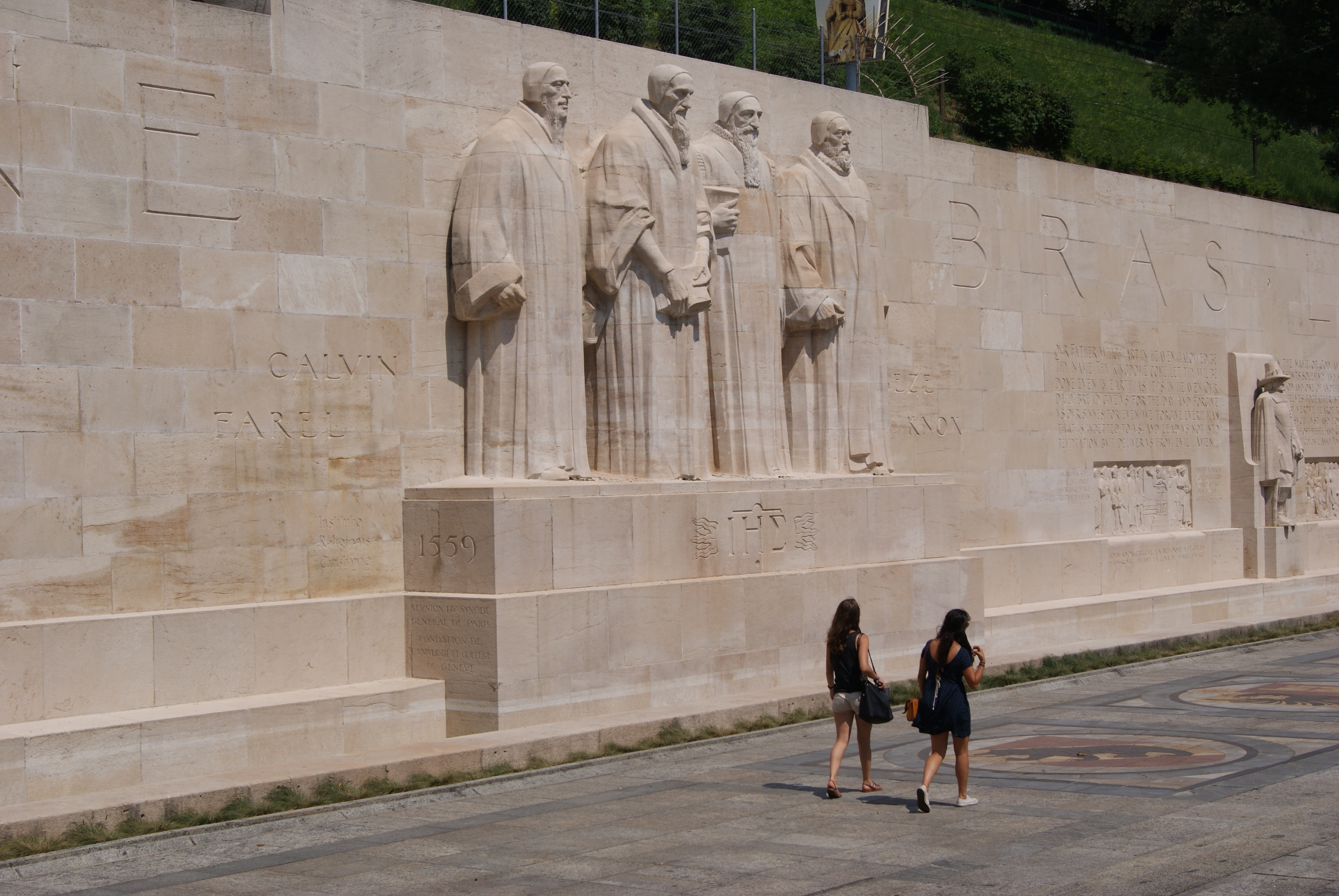
The Reformation Wall in Geneva

Henri Bouchard (13 December 1875 – 30 November 1960), was a French sculptor. His work was part of the sculpture event in the art competition at the 1924 Summer Olympics.

== Biography ==
The son of a carpenter, Bouchard was born in Dijon. He was educated at the Académie Julian and in the studio of Louis-Ernest Barrias before entering the École nationale supérieure des Beaux-Arts in Paris. He took the Prix de Rome in 1901. His attention turned away from models from antiquity, and towards peasants, everyday life, and ordinary workers. Bouchard himself became a professor at the Académie Julian in 1910.

In November 1941 Bouchard was one of a number of French painters and sculptors who accepted an official invitation from Joseph Goebbels for a grand tour of Nazi Germany. Others who accepted the invitation were Charles Despiau, Paul Landowski, André Dunoyer de Segonzac, and Fauve artists Kees van Dongen, Maurice de Vlaminck, and André Derain. On his return Bouchard had kind words about the status accorded artists in Nazi Germany. Upon Liberation, in 1944, Bouchard was suspended from his professorship, branded a collaborator and ostracized by many former supporters. He died in Paris.

The Musée Bouchard in Paris was opened in 1962 and closed in 2007, at the sculptor's former studio at 25 rue de l'Yvette. Its collections, including a large figure of Apollo displayed at the Palais de Chaillot, plus over a thousand other works such as bronze casts, stone sculptures, and original plaster works, have been transferred to the Musée de La Piscine in Roubaix. According to the museum's web site, a reconstruction of the studio was scheduled to open in 2010.

== Work ==
- symbols of the four evangelists, for the campanile of Basilique du Sacré-Cœur, Paris, 1911
- figure of the medieval sculptor Claus Sluter, 1911
- statues for the Reformation Wall in Geneva, executed with fellow French sculptor Paul Landowski, circa 1912
- monument to the children of Saint-Quentin (Aisne) in collaboration with the architect Paul Bigot and sculptor Paul Landowski, 1927
- Tombstone of Cardinal Louis-Ernest Dubois, Notre-Dame de Paris (1929)
- Christ on the Cross on the facade of the church of Saint-Martin, Chauny, France, circa 1930
- Boufarik colonization monument in French Algeria, 1930
- the tympanum of the church Saint Pierre de Chaillot in Paris, 1933–1935
- bronze Apollo for the Jardins du Trocadéro below the Palais de Chaillot, Paris, 1937
- the tombs of Albert Bartholomé, Gabriel Pierné and Général Grossetti, all in Père Lachaise Cemetery
- Inventor of the Bush hammer.

== Gallery ==
The Tympanum of Saint Pierre de Chaillot.

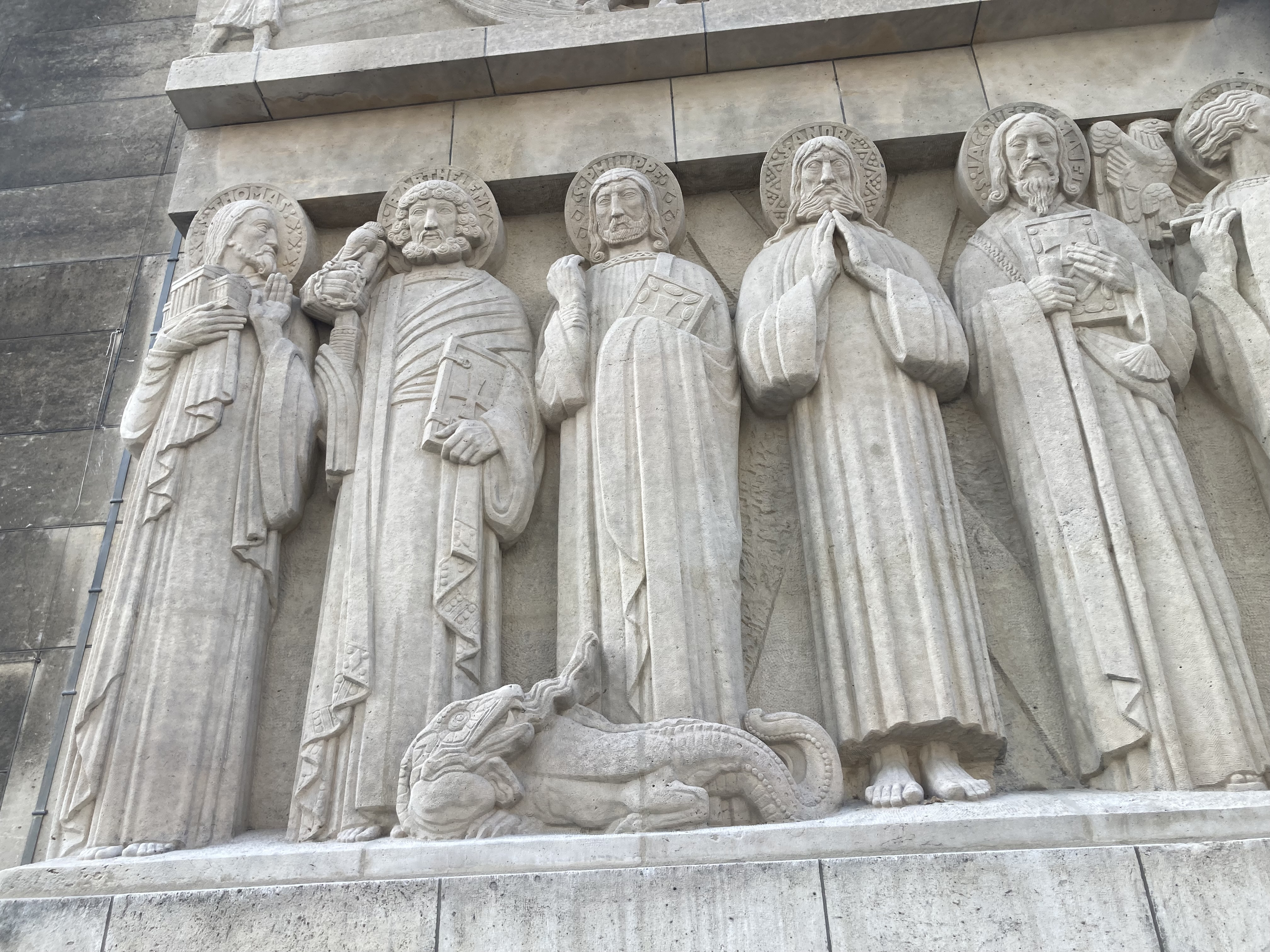
Details of sculptures by Henry Bouchard.

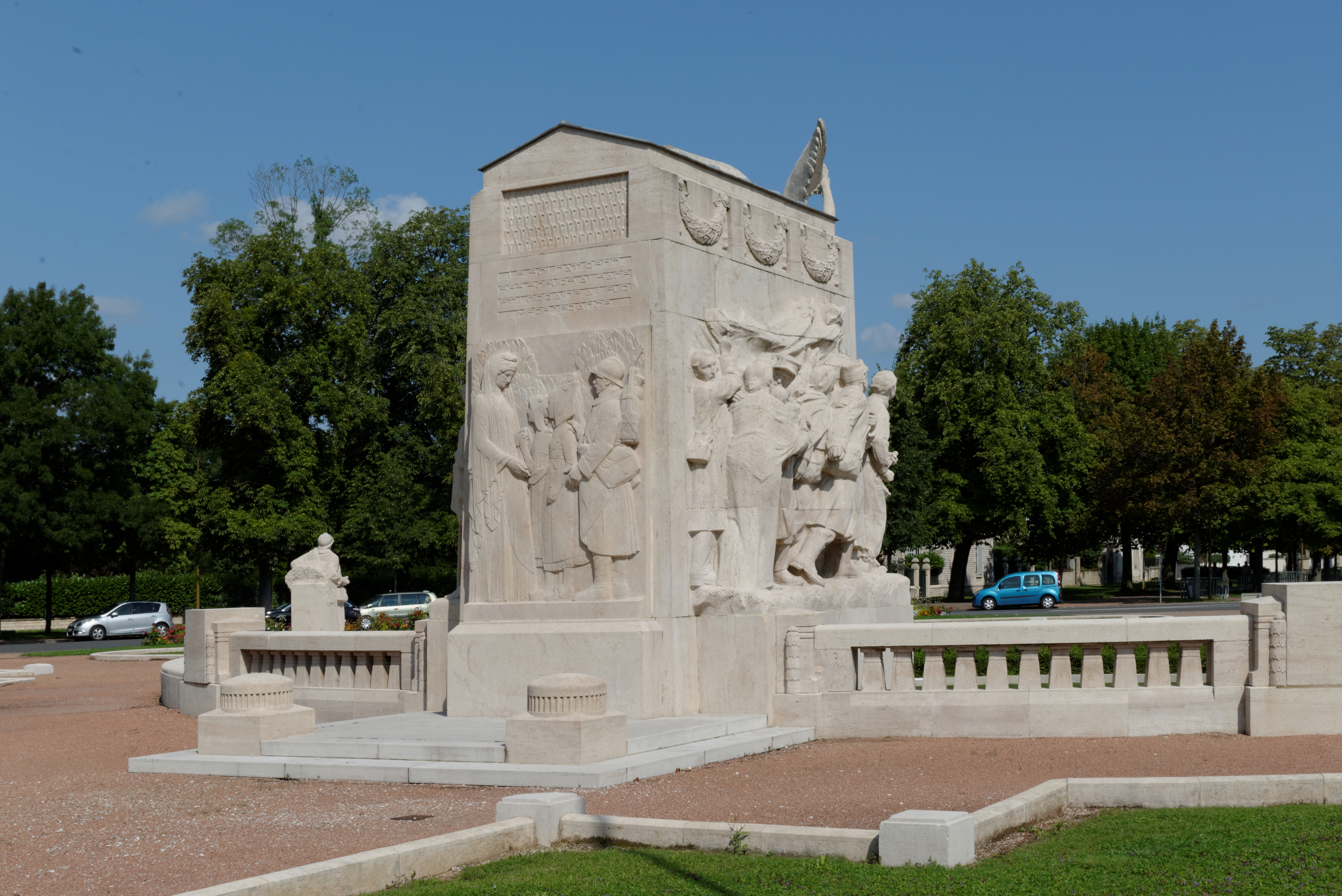
Bouchard contributed to this Victory Monument in Dijon.

Recreation of Henri Bouchard’s studio at the Musée de La Piscine in Roubaix.

== Sources ==
- (in French and English) Musée Bouchard (Bouchard Museum)
- (in French) Association des Amis d'Henri Bouchard (Henri Bouchard friends non-profit corporation)
- Golan, Romy (1995). Modernity and Nostalgia: Art and Politics in France Between the Wars.
