= Equestrian statue of Hubert Lyautey =

Coordinates: 33°35′25″N 7°37′05″W

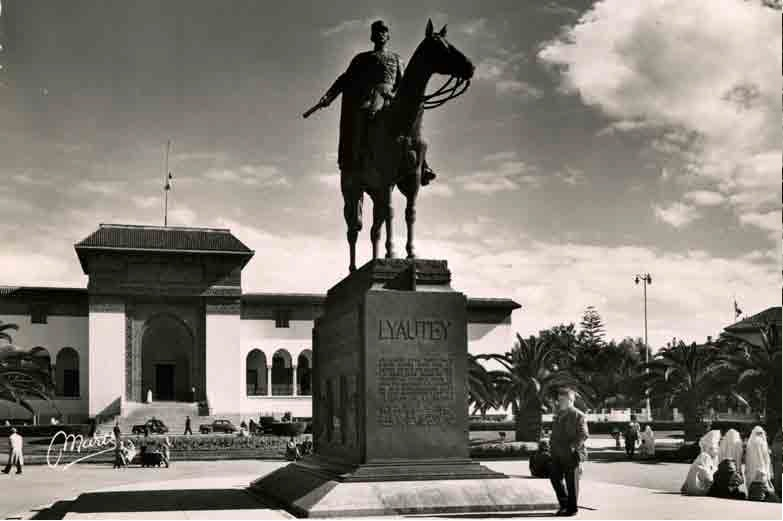
The statue in the late 1930s or 1940s

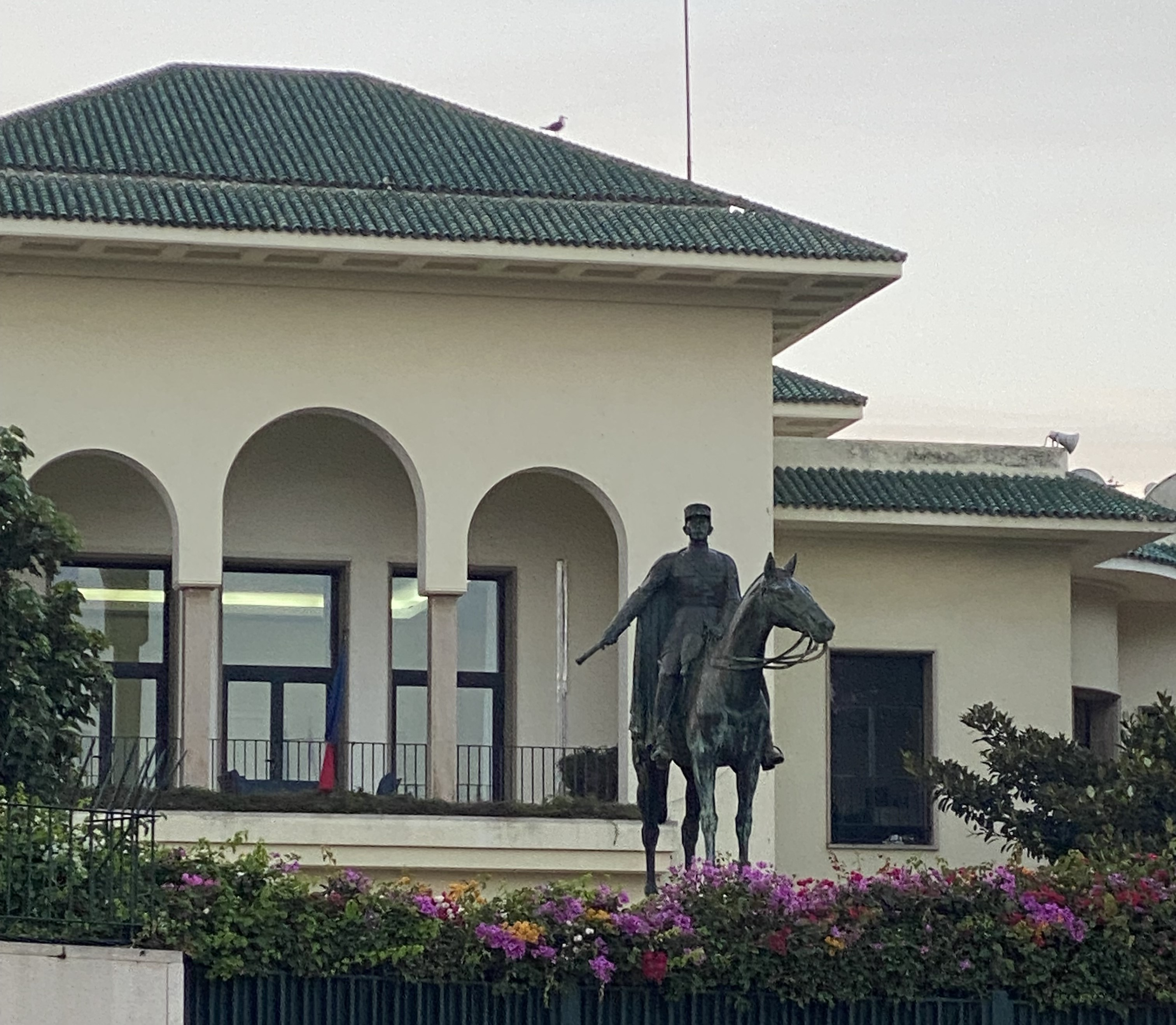
The statue relocated in front of the French consulate-general (2005)

The equestrian statue of Hubert Lyautey is a public sculpture that commemorates Hubert Lyautey, the first resident-general of the French protectorate in Morocco, in Casablanca, Morocco.

== History ==
The statue was created by French sculptor François Cogné and inaugurated on 5 November 1938 in front of the city's courthouse on Casablanca's main square, now Muhammad V Square. Sultan Mohammed V, Resident-general Charles Noguès, Lyautey's widow Inès de Bourgoing, French minister Guy La Chambre, and other notables attended the ceremony, at which French Academician Louis Gillet gave a florid speech.

A Moroccan stamp of 1946 pictures the statue.

In April 1959, the statue was relocated to the grounds of the nearby French consulate-general in Casablanca, where it remains visible from the square. In 2020, a petition requested the removal of the statue from public view, given its symbolism of colonial oppression under the French protectorate regime.

== See also ==
- Boufarik colonization monument
