= Central Post Office (Casablanca) =

Central Post Office of Casablanca
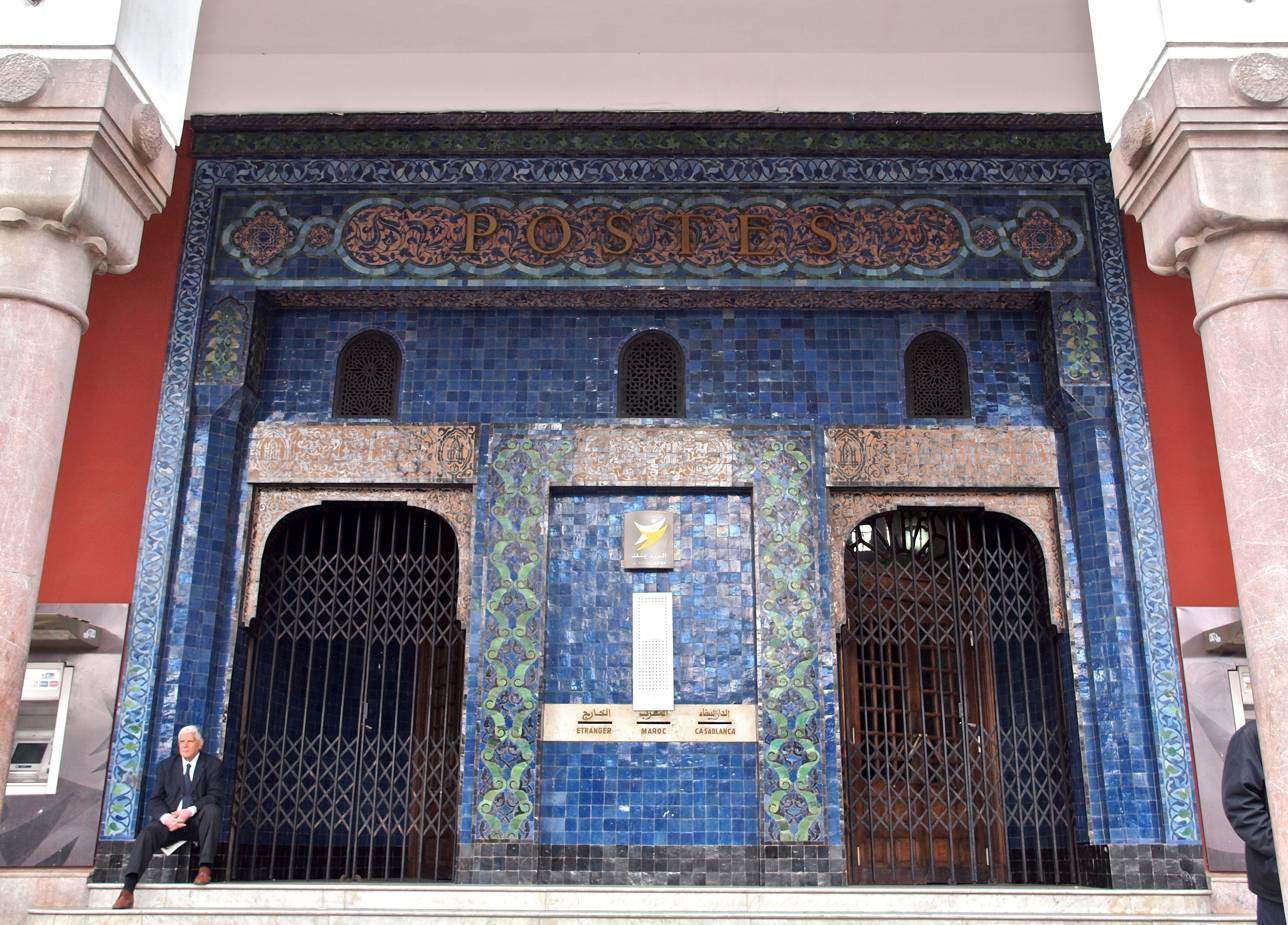
- La Poste Centrale
- Interactive map of the Central Post Office of Casablanca area

General information
- Location: Casablance
- Coordinates: 33.59274688131752°N 7.618985330985145°W

The Central Post Office of Casablanca (Arabic: مكتب البريد المركزي, romanized: Maktab al-Barīd al-Markazī, French: La Poste Centrale) is a post office on Boulevard de Paris and Hassan II Boulevard in Casablanca, Morocco. It was designed by Adrien Laforgue in an architectural style described as "neo-mauresque" and was constructed from 1918 to 1920 under the French Protectorate.

== History ==
It was the first building completed at the Place Administrative (now Muhammad V Square).

== Architecture ==
Albert Laprade described the building as "paradigmatic in every respect; it is clear, concise, and practical and will make any Frenchman turn green with envy."

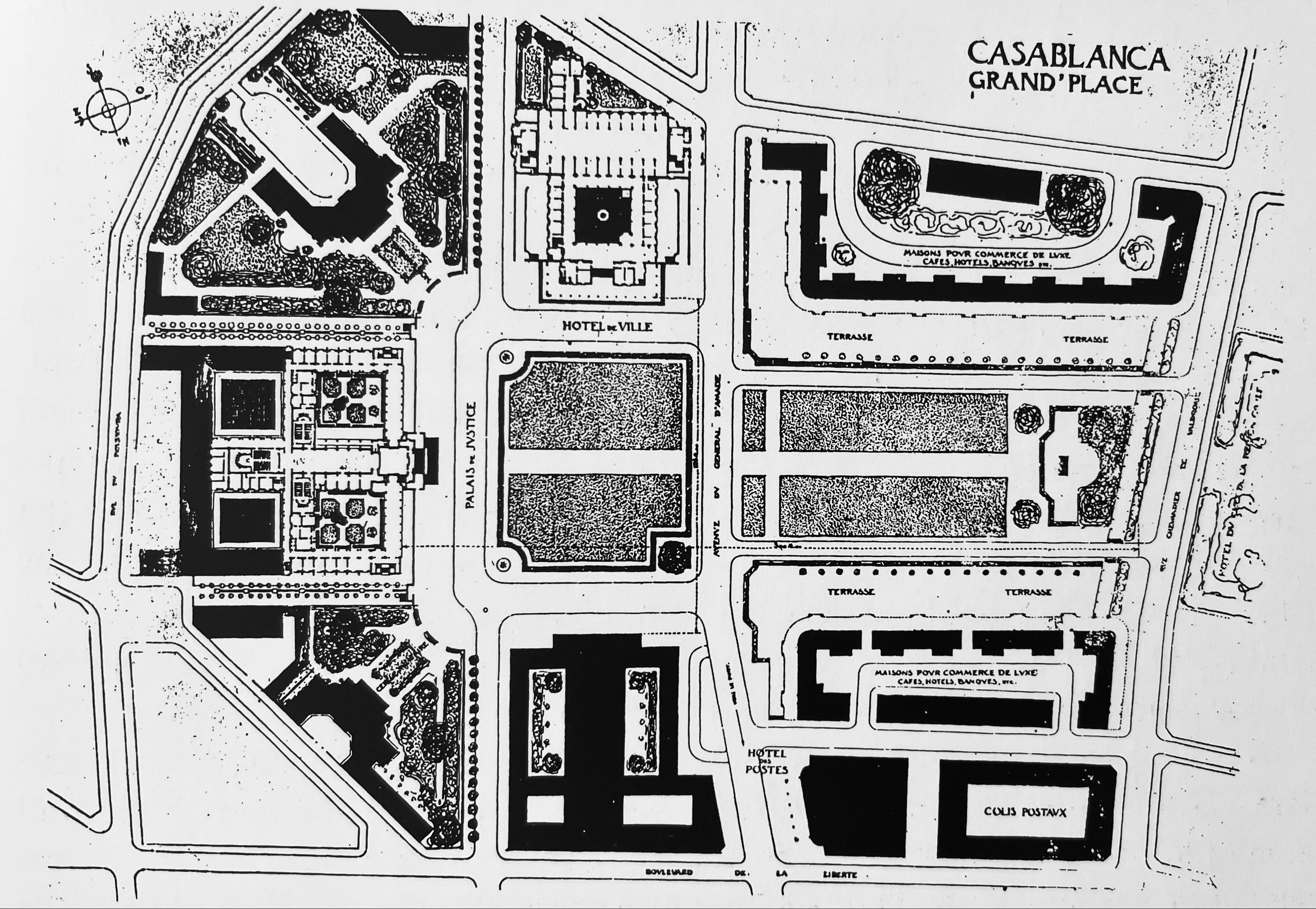
Joseph Marrast's 1920 plan for the Place Administrative, with the "Hotel des Postes" marked in the lower center

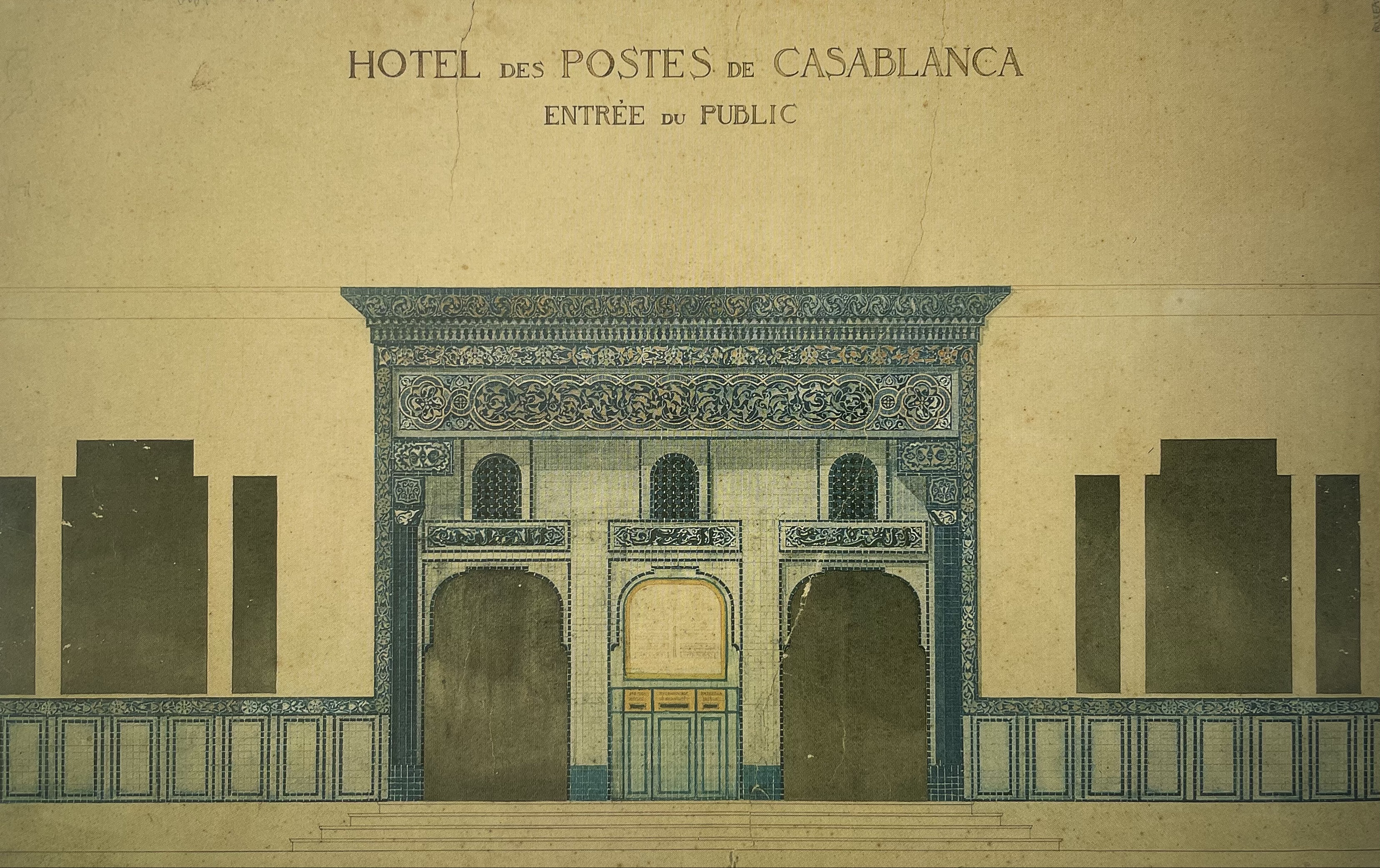
The public entrance design drawing by architect Laforgue

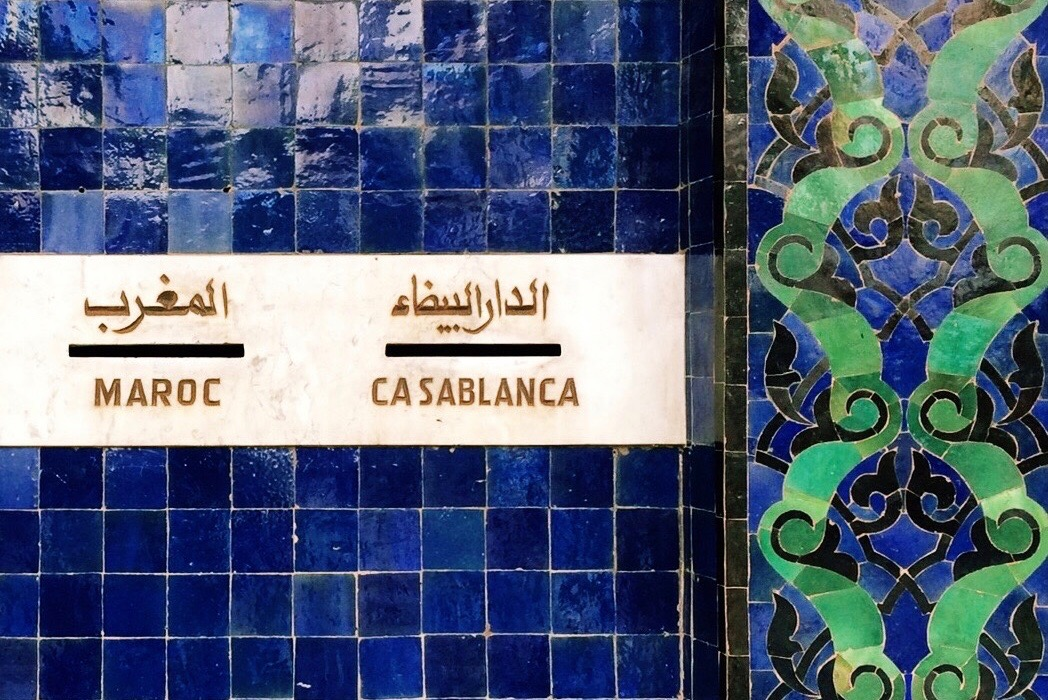
Post boxes, labeled in Arabic and French, in the mosaic façade of the public entrance
