= Casablanca Conference =

1943 conference between Allied leaders for WWII military planning

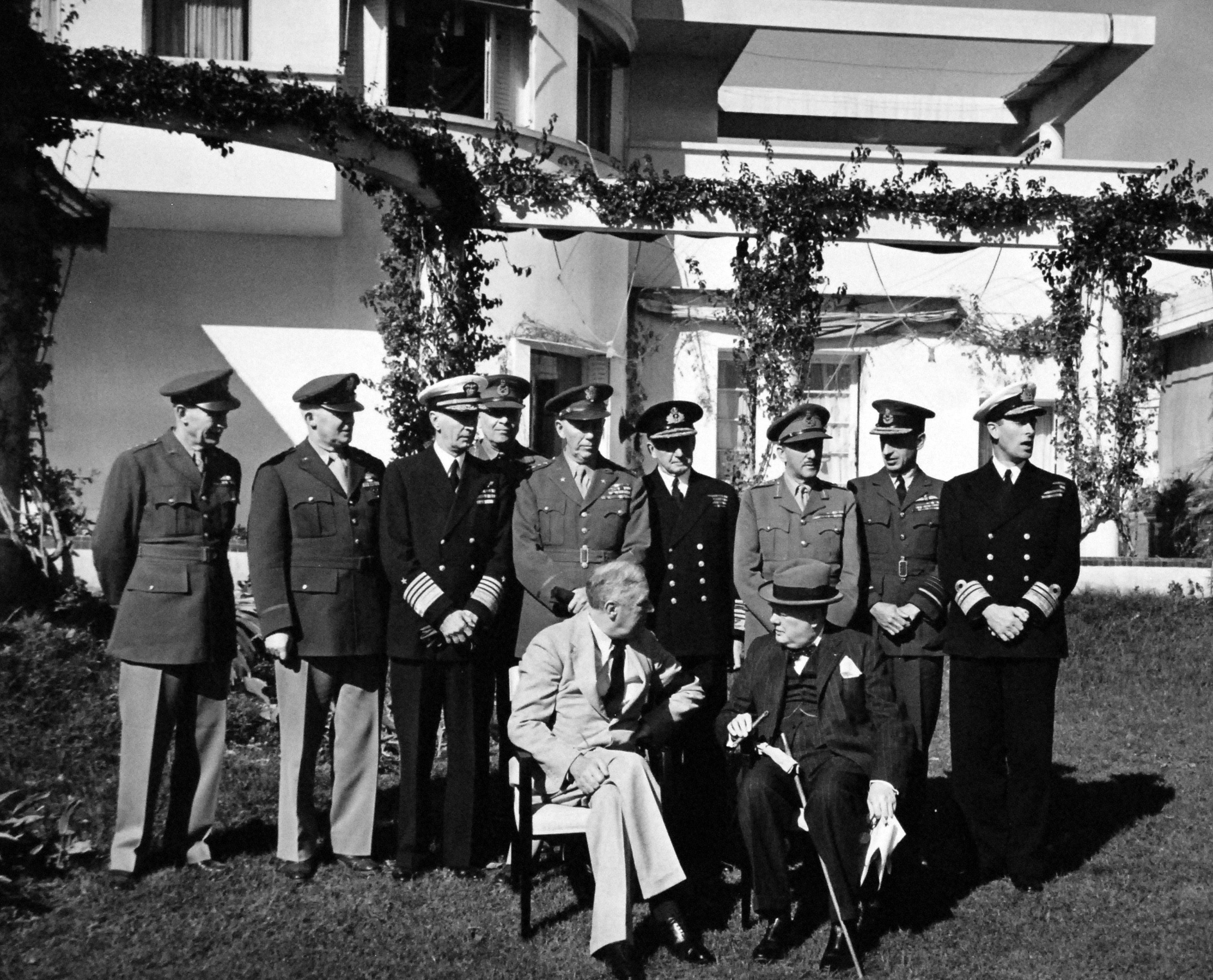
- United States President Franklin D. Roosevelt, British prime minister Winston Churchill, and their advisors in Casablanca, 1943
- Date: January 14, 1943 – January 24, 1943
- Cities: Casablanca, French Morocco
- Venues: Anfa Hotel
- Participants: United Kingdom; United States; Free France

The Casablanca Conference (codenamed SYMBOL) or Anfa Conference was held in Casablanca, French Morocco, from January 14 to 24, 1943, to plan the Allied European strategy for the next phase of World War II. The main discussions were between US President Franklin Roosevelt (with his military staff) and British Prime Minister Winston Churchill (with his staff). Stalin could not attend. Key decisions included a commitment to demand Axis powers' unconditional surrender; plans for an invasion of Sicily and Italy before the main invasion of France; an intensified strategic bombing campaign against Germany; and approval of a US Navy plan to advance on Japan through the central Pacific and the Philippines. The last item authorized the island-hopping campaign in the Pacific, which shortened the war. Of all the decisions made, the most important was the Allied invasion of Sicily, which Churchill pushed for in part to divert American attention from opening a second front in France in 1943, a move that he feared would result in very high Allied casualties and not be possible until 1944.

Also attending were the sovereign of Morocco, Sultan Muhammad V, and representing the Free French forces, Generals Charles de Gaulle and Henri Giraud, but they played minor roles and were not part of the military planning. Joseph Stalin, General Secretary of the Communist Party of the Soviet Union, declined to attend, citing the ongoing Battle of Stalingrad as requiring his presence in Moscow.

During the meeting, Churchill and Roosevelt publicly issued the Casablanca Declaration, which introduced their policy of "unconditional surrender". This policy represented the Allied determination to achieve total victory over the Axis powers.

== Casablanca Declaration of "unconditional surrender" ==
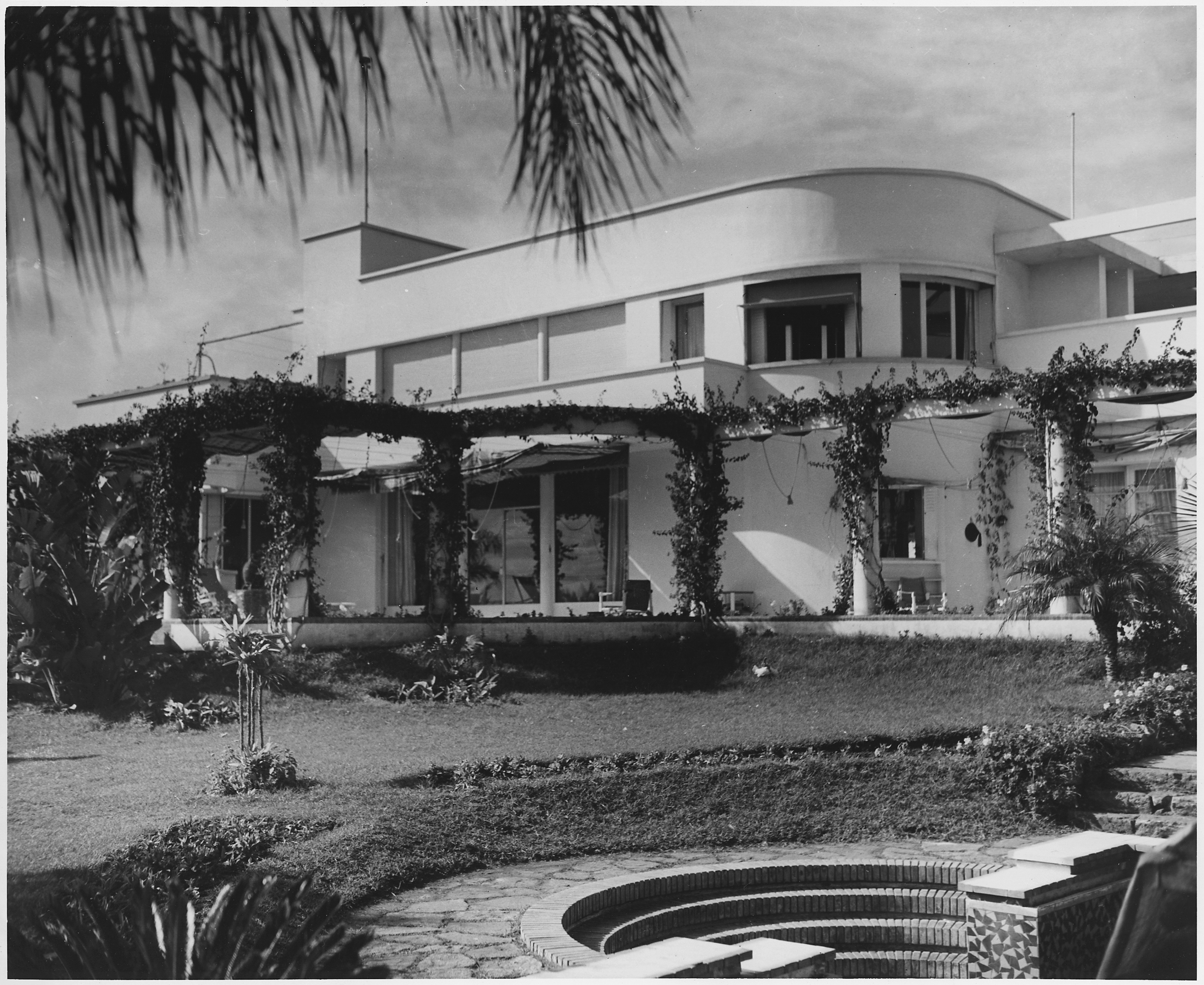
Marius Boyer's Anfa Hotel in Casablanca, venue of the conference.

The conference produced a unified statement of purpose, the Casablanca Declaration. It announced to the world that the Allies would accept nothing less than the "unconditional surrender" of the Axis powers. Roosevelt had borrowed the term from US Army General Ulysses S. Grant (known as "Unconditional Surrender" Grant), who had communicated that stance to the Confederate commander during the American Civil War. So Roosevelt stated at the concluding press conference on 24 January that the Allies were demanding "unconditional surrender" from the Germans, the Italians and the Japanese.

In a February 12, 1943 radio address, Roosevelt explained what he meant by unconditional surrender: "we mean no harm to the common people of the Axis nations. But we do mean to impose punishment and retribution upon their guilty, barbaric leaders".

Behind the scenes, the United States and the United Kingdom were divided in the commitment to see the war through to Germany's capitulation and "unconditional surrender". But Churchill had agreed in advance about "unconditional surrender"; he had cabled the War Cabinet four days earlier and they had not objected. US General George Marshall also said that he had been consulted; he had stated on 7 January that Allied morale would be "strengthened by the uncompromising demand, and Stalin's suspicions allayed".

However some source material contradicts the official reported accord between Churchill and Roosevelt, claiming that Churchill did not fully subscribe to the doctrine of "unconditional surrender". The New York Times correspondent Drew Middleton, who was in Casablanca at the conference, later revealed in his book, Retreat From Victory, that Churchill had been "startled by the [public] announcement [of unconditional surrender]. I tried to hide my surprise. But I was his [Roosevelt's] ardent lieutenant".

According to historian Charles Bohlen, "Responsibility for this unconditional surrender doctrine rests almost exclusively with President Roosevelt". He guessed that Roosevelt made the announcement "to keep Soviet forces engaged with Germany on the Russian front, thus depleting German munitions and troops" and also "to prevent Stalin from negotiating a separate peace with the Nazi regime".

That the war would be fought by the Allies until the total annihilation of enemy forces was not universally welcomed. Diplomatic insiders were critical that such a stance was too unequivocal and inflexible, would prevent any opportunity for political maneuvering and would be morally debilitating to French and German resistance groups.

The British felt that arriving at some accommodation with Germany would allow the German Army to help fight off a Soviet takeover of Eastern Europe. To Churchill and the other Allied leaders, the real obstacle to realising that mutual strategy with Germany was the leadership of Adolf Hitler. Allen Dulles, the chief of OSS intelligence in Bern, Switzerland, maintained that the Casablanca Declaration was "merely a piece of paper to be scrapped without further ado if Germany would sue for peace. Hitler had to go."

There is evidence that German resistance forces, highly placed anti-Nazi government officials, were working with British intelligence, MI6, to eliminate Hitler and negotiate a peace with the Allies. One such individual was Admiral Wilhelm Canaris, head of German intelligence, the Abwehr. His persistent overtures for support from the United States were ignored by Roosevelt.

== Topics of discussion and agreements ==
=== European invasion ===
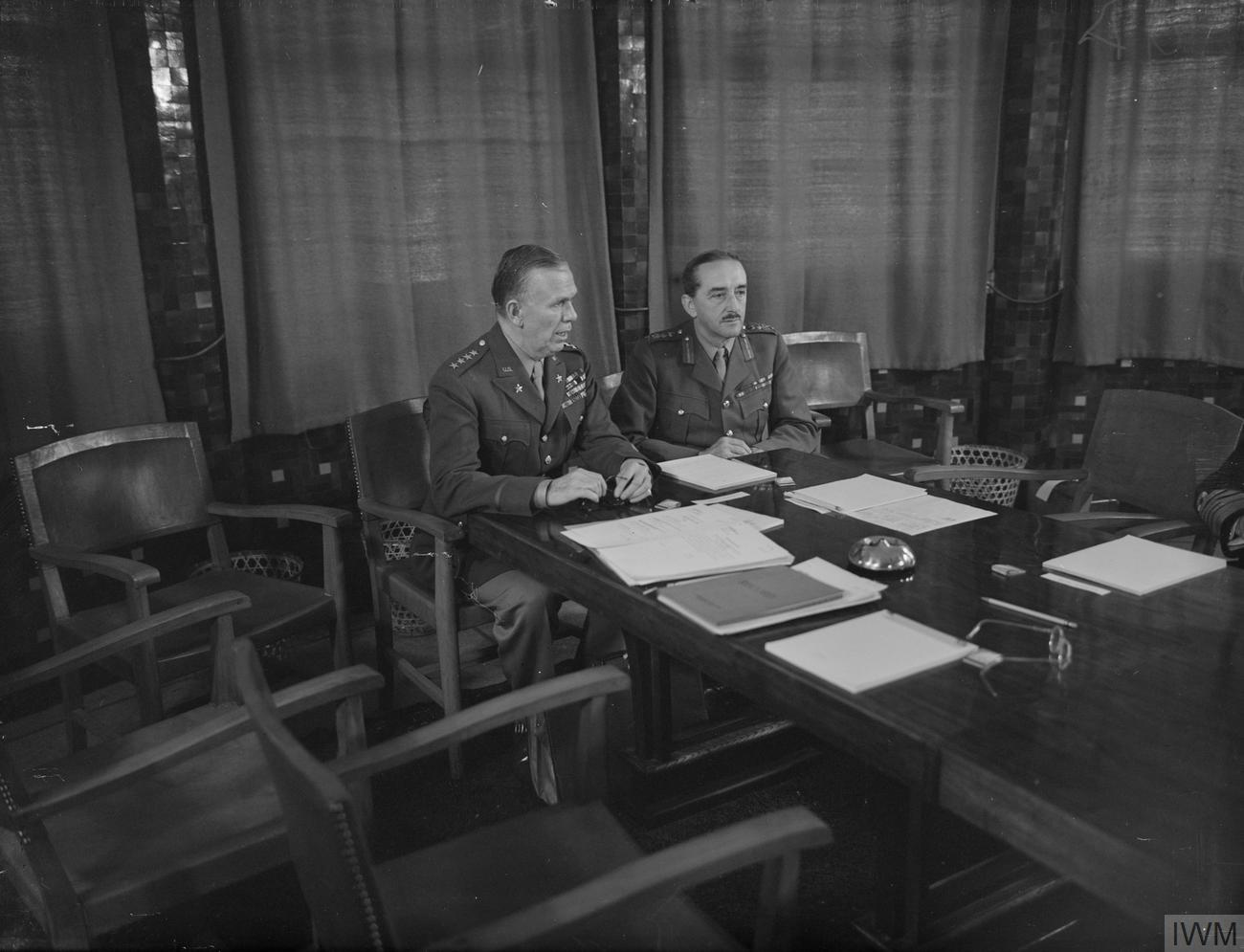
George Marshall (left), Sir Alan Brooke (right)

Roosevelt, with advice from General George Marshall, the U.S. Army Chief of Staff, lobbied for a cross-Channel invasion of Europe. Churchill, with advice from the British Chiefs of Staff, led by General Sir Alan Brooke, the Chief of the Imperial General Staff (CIGS, the professional head of the British Army), felt the time was not opportune, and favored an Allied assault on the island of Sicily followed by an invasion of mainland Italy. The British argument centred on the need to pull German reserves down into Italy where, due to the relatively poor north–south lines of communication, they could not be easily extracted to defend against a later invasion of northwest Europe. Additionally, by delaying the cross-Channel landing, it would mean that any invasion would be against a German army further weakened by many more months' fighting on the Eastern Front against the Red Army.

Throughout the conference, Roosevelt's attention was prominently focused on the Pacific War front and he faulted the British for what he felt was not a full commitment against Japanese entrenchment. The Italian strategy was agreed upon, a compromise between the two leaders, Roosevelt acceding to Churchill's approach for Europe. Churchill, in turn, pledged more troops and resources to the Pacific and Burma to reinforce positions held by Chiang Kai-shek against the Japanese. The United States would provide assistance to the British in the Pacific by supplying escorts and landing craft.

=== Logistical issues ===
- Next phase of European war
- All possible aid would be provided to the Russian offensive
- Assessment of U-boat danger in the Atlantic
- Disposition of ships, planes, troops in the various theatres of war
- Stalin and Chiang Kai-shek would be fully apprised of the conference agenda and resulting accords

=== Leadership of Free French forces ===
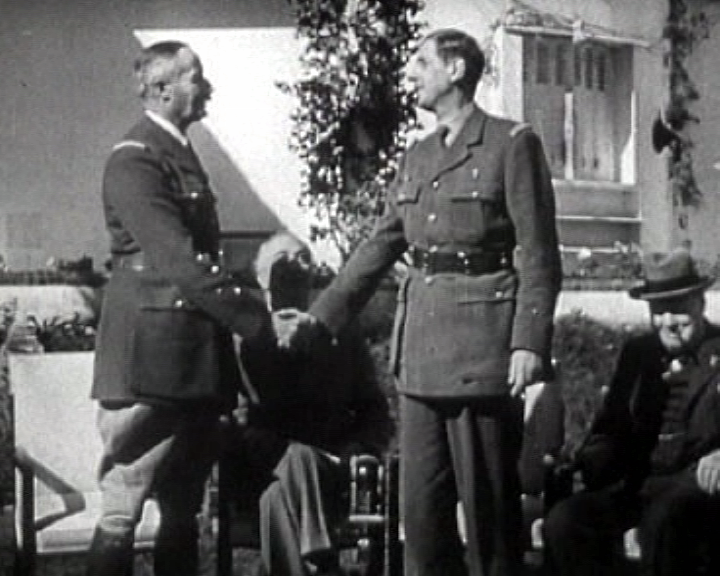
Leaders of the Free French forces: General Henri Giraud (L) and General Charles de Gaulle (R) at the Casablanca Conference.

Charles de Gaulle had to be forced to attend, and he met a chilly reception from Roosevelt and Churchill. No French representatives were allowed to attend the military planning sessions.

The conference called for the official recognition of a joint leadership of the Free French forces by de Gaulle and Henri Giraud. There was notable tension between the two men, who limited their interactions to formalities like pledging their mutual support. Roosevelt encouraged them to shake hands for the photographers eager for a photo opportunity, but the ritual handshake was with reluctance and done so quickly that they reportedly had to pose for a second shot. Roosevelt would later describe this meeting between the French leaders as a "shotgun wedding".

Elliott Roosevelt's book, As He Saw It (1946) describes how Franklin Roosevelt wanted the French provisional government to be set up with Giraud and de Gaulle, who would be "equally responsible for its composition and welfare." (89) That is because Franklin Roosevelt saw de Gaulle as Churchill's puppet and thought that Giraud would be more compliant with US interests. Complications arose because most people in the French Resistance considered de Gaulle the undisputed leader of the Resistance and so Giraud was progressively dispossessed of his political and military roles. Roosevelt eventually recognized de Gaulle as the head of the Free French in October 1944.

=== Plans for postwar northern Africa ===
The day before, Roosevelt became the first US president to visit Africa when he stayed at the city of Bathurst, Gambia. The poor situation of Gambians under the British Empire further increased his anti-colonialism, leading him to further discuss and impress upon Churchill the need for an international trusteeship system that would advance colonies like Gambia towards independence.

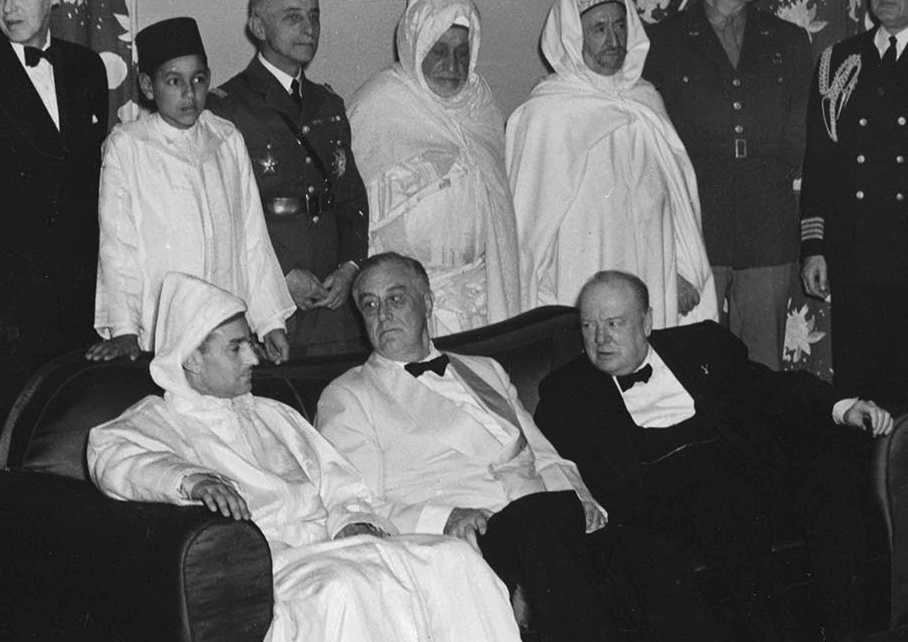
Sultan Muhammad V seated with Roosevelt and Churchill. Behind them, General Patton, Robert D. Murphy, Harry Hopkins, Hassan II, General Nogues, Muhammad al-Muqri, the Moroccan Chief of Protocol, Elliott Roosevelt, and John L. McCrea.

During the Conference, Roosevelt met privately with Churchill and Sultan Muhammad V of Morocco, who was accompanied by his 14-year-old son, Crown Prince Moulay Hassan (the future Hassan II).

Roosevelt also spoke with the French resident general at Rabat, Morocco, about postwar independence and Jewish immigrants in North Africa. Roosevelt proposed that:

"[t]he number of Jews engaged in the practice of the professions (law, medicine, etc.) should be definitely limited to the percentage that the Jewish population in North Africa bears to the whole of the North African population.... [T]his plan would further eliminate the specific and understandable complaints which the Germans bore towards the Jews in Germany, namely, that while they represented a small part of the population, over 50 percent of the lawyers, doctors, schoolteachers, college professors, etc., in Germany were Jews."

This disposition of the Jewish population harkened back to a mindset communicated in earlier years to Roosevelt by the American ambassador to Germany, William Dodd (1933–1937). Dodd had appraised Germany's repression of Jews, and writing to Roosevelt, he said: "The Jews had held a great many more of the key positions in Germany than their number or talents entitled them to."

Roosevelt presented the results of the conference to the American people in a radio address on February 12, 1943.

During the return trip to the United States, President Roosevelt met with the President of Brazil, Getúlio Vargas, at the Potenji River Conference, where they discussed Brazil's participation in the war effort and defined the agreements that led to the creation of the Brazilian Expeditionary Force. The conference took place aboard the USS Humboldt in the Potenji River harbor in Natal, on January 28 and 29, 1943.

== See also ==
- Atlantic Charter
- Casablanca directive the Allied strategic bombing directive issued shortly after the Casablanca Conference.
- List of Allied World War II conferences

| Preceded by Cherchell Conference; October 21–22, 1942 | World War II Conferences; Casablanca Conference; January 14–24, 1943 | Succeeded by Washington Conference (1943); May 12–17, 1943 |
