= Musée Bouchard =

Defunct museum in Paris, France

Coordinates: 48°51′12.5″N 2°15′57″E

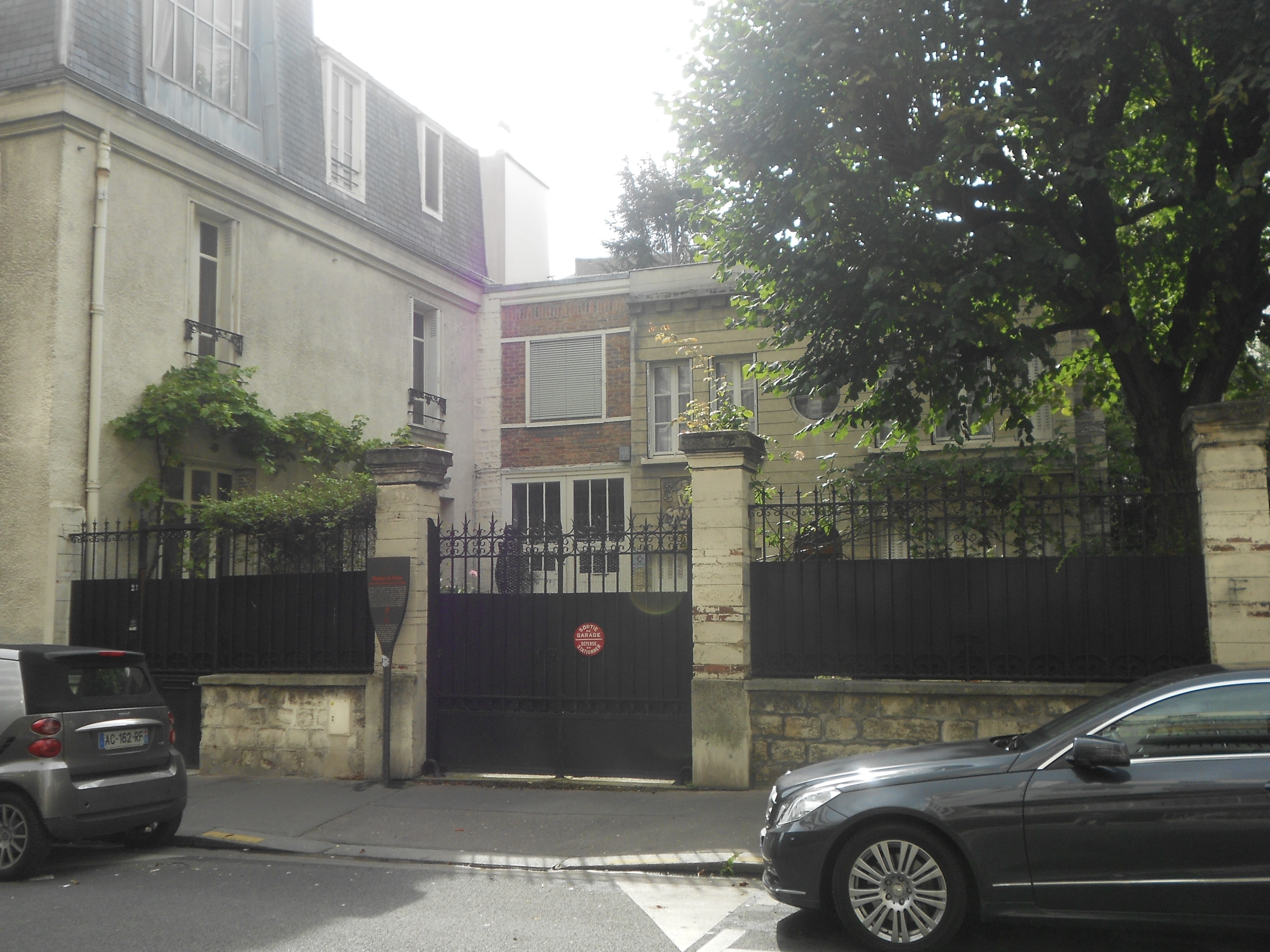

The Musée Bouchard was a studio museum dedicated to sculptor Henri Bouchard (1875-1960), and located at 25, rue de l'Yvette, Paris, France.

The museum was established in Bouchard's studio after his death in 1960, and open to the public from 1962 to 2007. Its collections, including a large figure of Apollo displayed at the Palais de Chaillot, plus over a thousand other works such as bronze casts, stone sculptures, and original plaster works, have subsequently been transferred to the Musée de La Piscine in Roubaix. According to the museum's web site, a reconstruction of the studio was scheduled to open in 2010.

== See also ==
- List of museums in Paris
