= Cinema Vox (Casablanca) =

Casablanca, Morocco movie theater

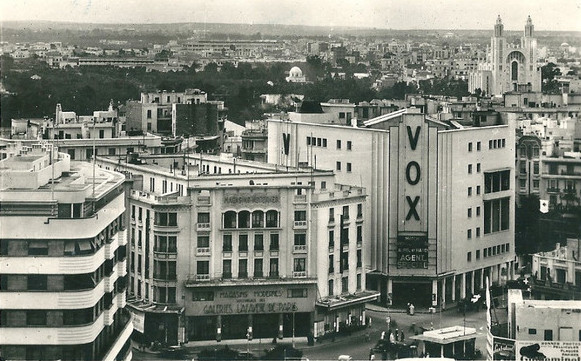
Aerial picture of Cinema Vox, 1950.

Cinema Vox was a 20th-century movie theater in Casablanca, Morocco. It was designed by Marius Boyer and completed in 1935, under the French Protectorate. It was considered one of the largest movie theaters in Africa.

== History ==
Cinema Vox opened in 1935, designed by Marius Boyer during the French colonial period. Located on what was then Louis Gentil Square (now part of United Nations Square), the theater quickly became a landmark of cultural life in Casablanca.

During World War II, Cinema Vox served as a gathering place for American soldiers stationed in the city. It famously hosted extended screenings of the 1942 film Casablanca, further cementing its place in local memory.

The cinema remained active into the post-independence era but was eventually closed and demolished in the mid-1970s. Its decline was attributed to the rise of home video and changing urban dynamics. Despite its disappearance, it remains a symbol of Casablanca’s cinematic and architectural heritage.

== Architecture ==
It had three stacked balconies and could seat up to 2,000 spectators. It also had a foldaway ceiling, allowing the audience to enjoy the cool air of the evening. The building had the shape of a "cubic mass," which matched the Magasins Paris-Maroc Building next-door. The architecture of the Vox continued to serve as a reference for movie theaters built after independence.

== Miscellaneous ==
Nass El Ghiwane had a breakthrough concert at Cinema Vox.
