= Wilaya Building =

Hall of the Wilaya of Grand Casablanca
- مقر ولاية الدار البيضاء الكبرى
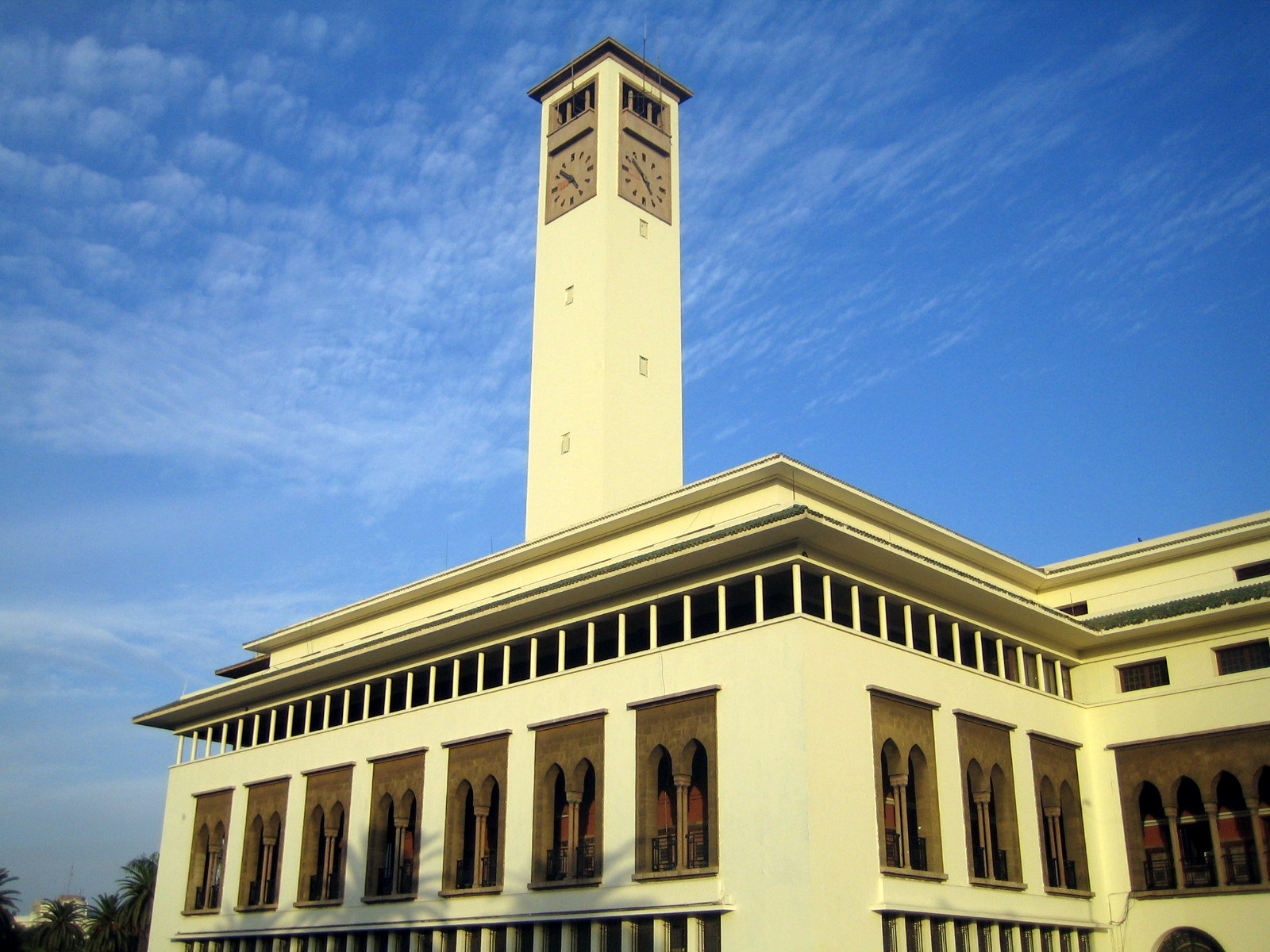
- Interactive map of the Hall of the Wilaya of Grand Casablanca area

General information
- Architectural style: Neo-Mauresque, Art Deco
- Location: Muhammad V Square, Casablanca, Morocco
- Coordinates: 33.5903°N 7.6190°W

Design and construction
- Architect: Marius Boyer

The Wilaya Building (Arabic: مقر ولاية الدار البيضاء الكبرى Hall of the Wilaya (Province) of Grand Casablanca, locally known as مقر الولاية Maqarr El-Wilaya or just El-Wilaya) is the building that houses the administration of Grand Casablanca. It was designed by Marius Boyer and built from 1928-1937 during the French Protectorate in Morocco. The building is located at Muhammad V Square in central Casablanca, Morocco, and it remains an emblematic building of the city's architecture.

== History ==
At the request of Hubert Lyautey, plans for an Hôtel de Ville were first drafted by Henri Prost in 1914, early on in the French Protectorate in Morocco, and then further developed in 1920. It was Marius Boyer, however, who ultimately won the administrative building's design competition in 1927. Construction started in 1928 and finished in 1937.

== Architecture ==
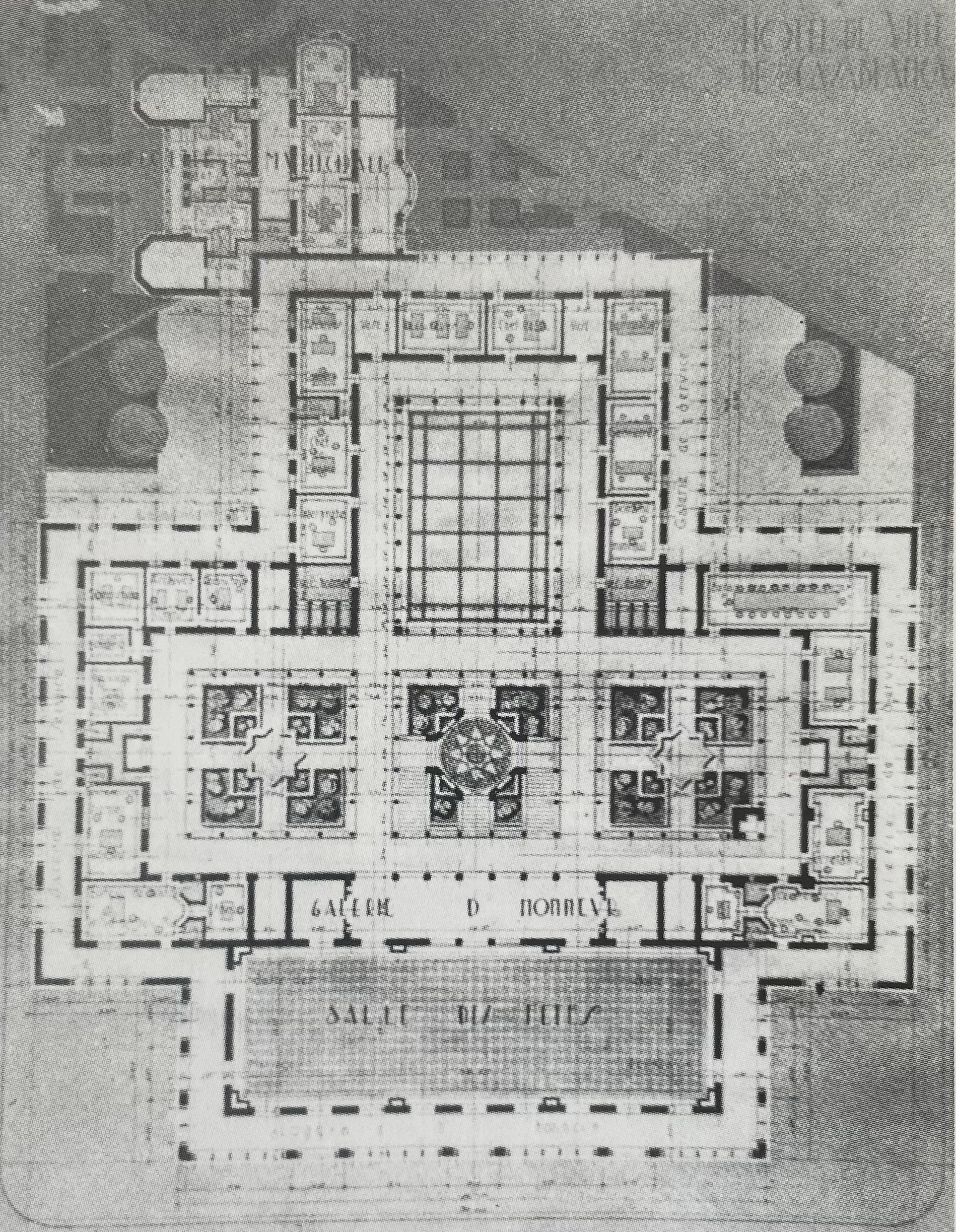
Marius Boyer's second floor plan for Casablanca's city hall.

The facade of the building is composed of a series of austere stone columns that surround the entrance. Above these, there is a long balcony with 3 large arched openings. It includes traditional features of Moroccan Makhzen architecture: stone, whitewashed lime plaster, zellige tile work, and green roof tiles.

The building has three Mauro-Andalusi riad-style ṣuḥūn, or internal courtyards with fountains and plants, enveloped by riwaq (arcades) on the first and second floors. There is Venetian inspiration in the clock tower that rises high above the building, as well as in the exposed galleries on the exterior of the building, reminiscent of the Doge's Palace.

Following directives from the résidence général, or colonial administration, Boyer blended styles, with some elements of French Art Deco, particularly visible in the clock tower and the grand staircase, and elements of traditional Mauro-Andalusi architecture: courtyards, columns, arches, and tiles. Traditional materials such as tiles were reinterpreted with Art Deco sensibilities.

The grand staircase was decorated with two panels painted by Jacques Majorelle, though they have since been relocated.

Marble and copper used in the grand staircase.

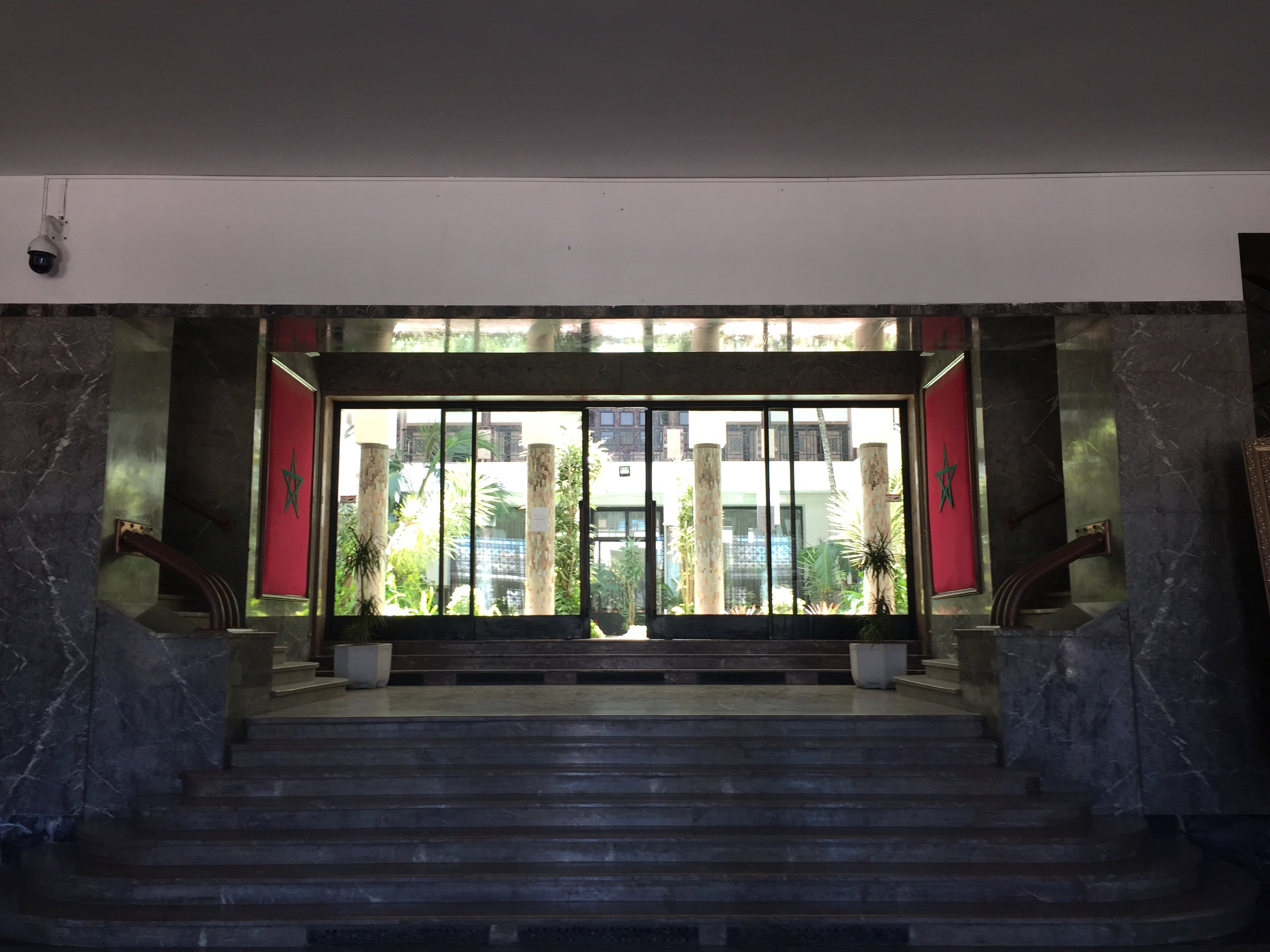
The internal courtyards as seen from the entrance hall.

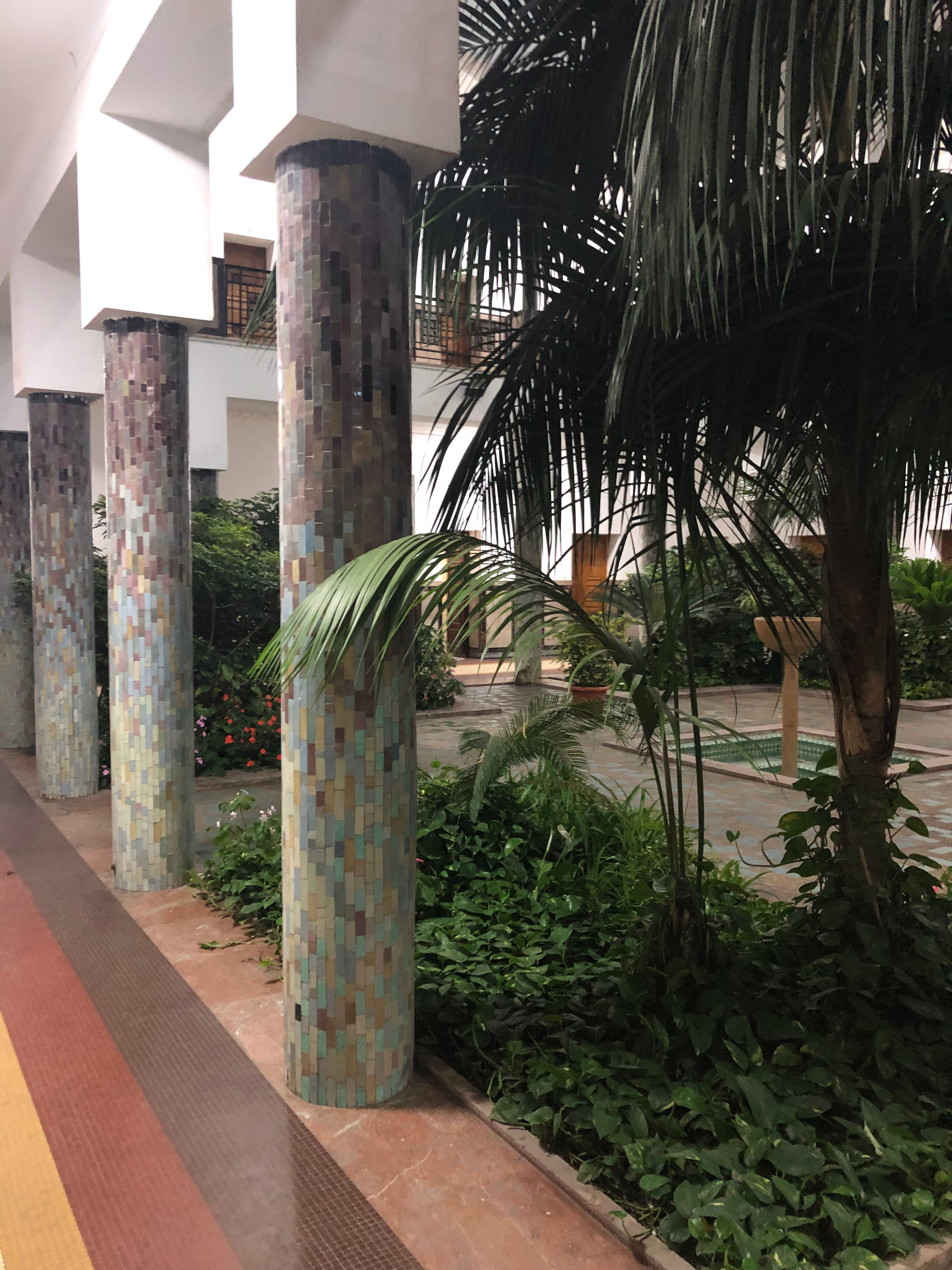
Traditional zellige reinterpreted.

Zellige-covered columns in the arcade surrounding the ṣuḥūn.

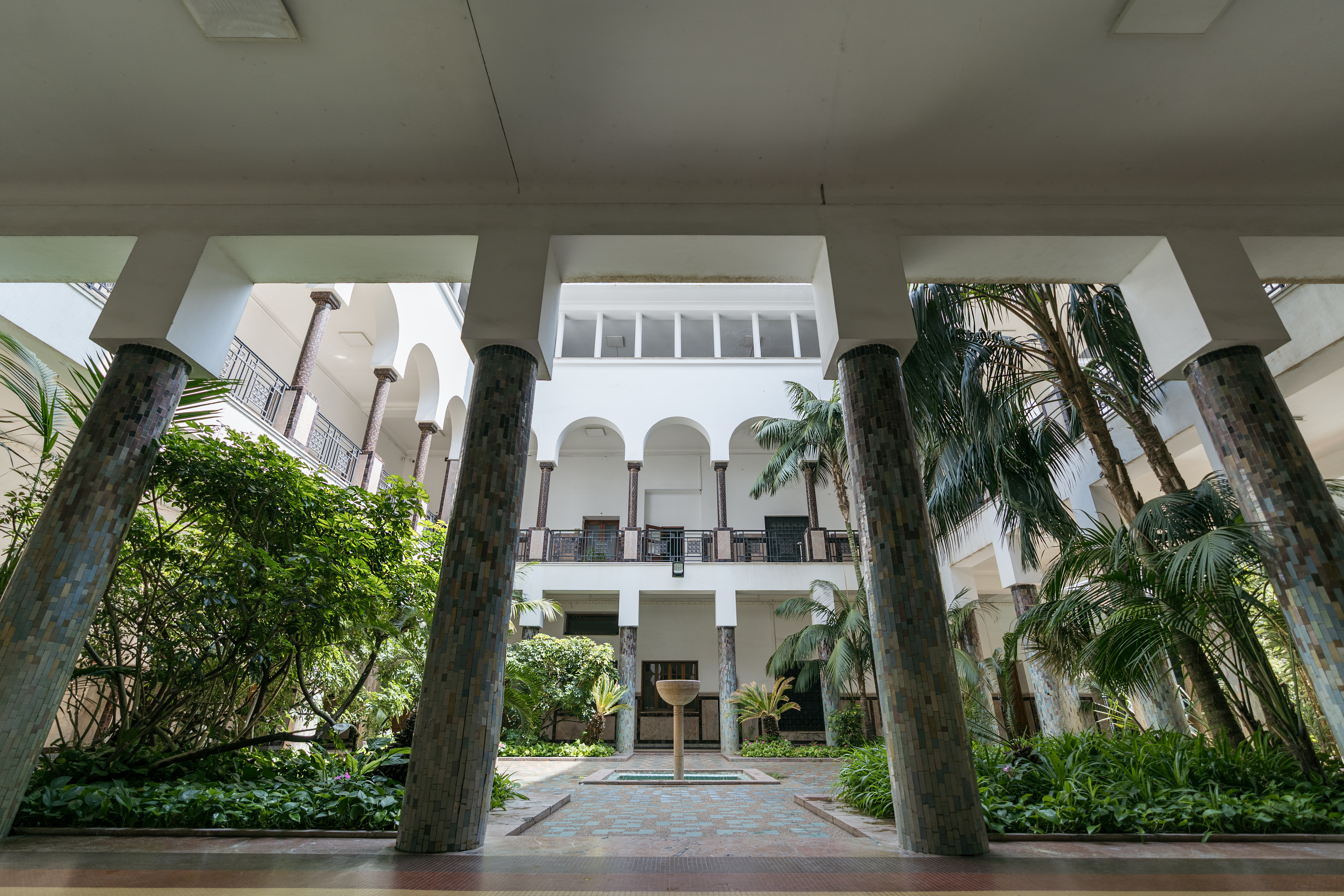
Wide view of Riad style courtyard

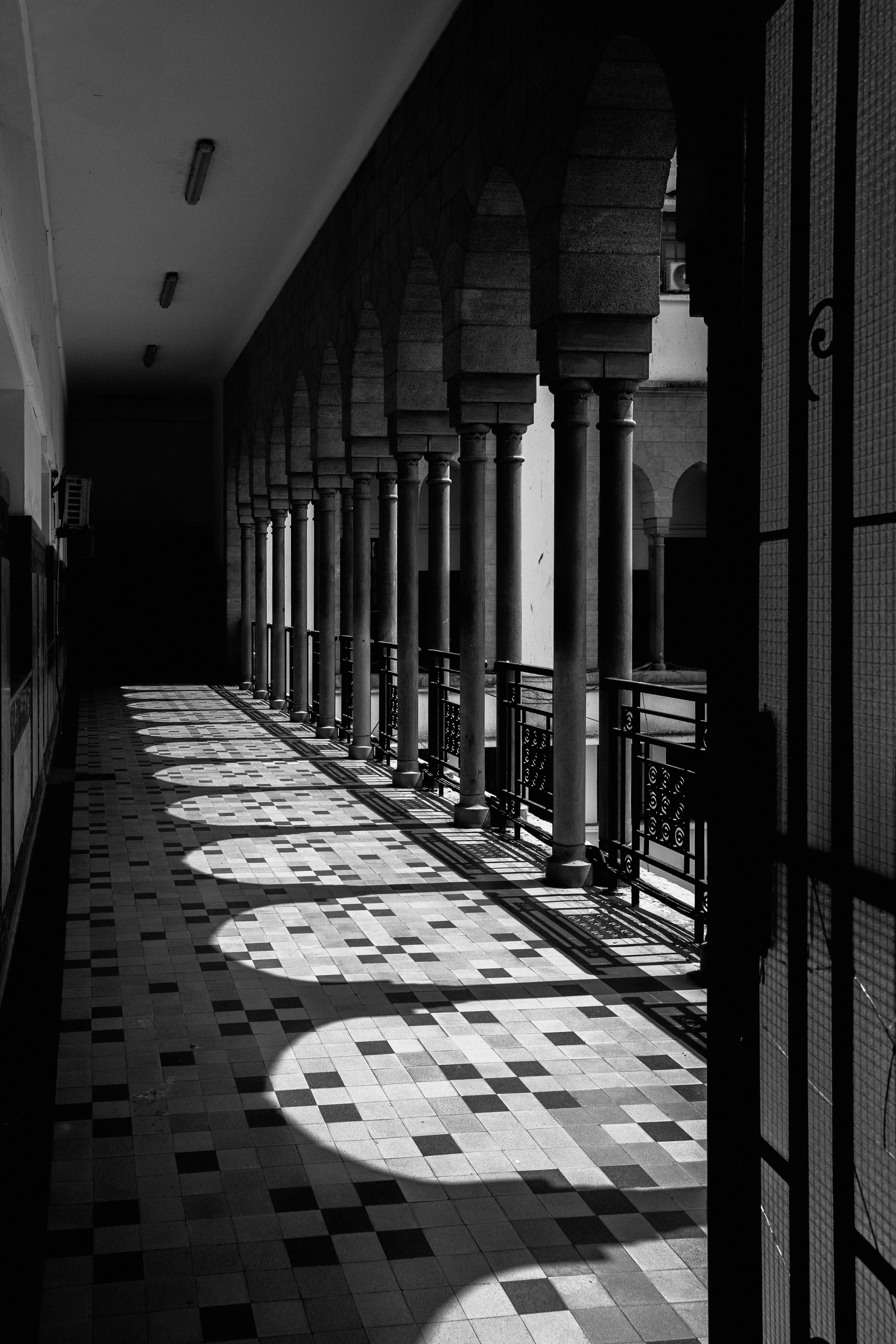
Shadows of arches fall along one of Wilaya's external balconies

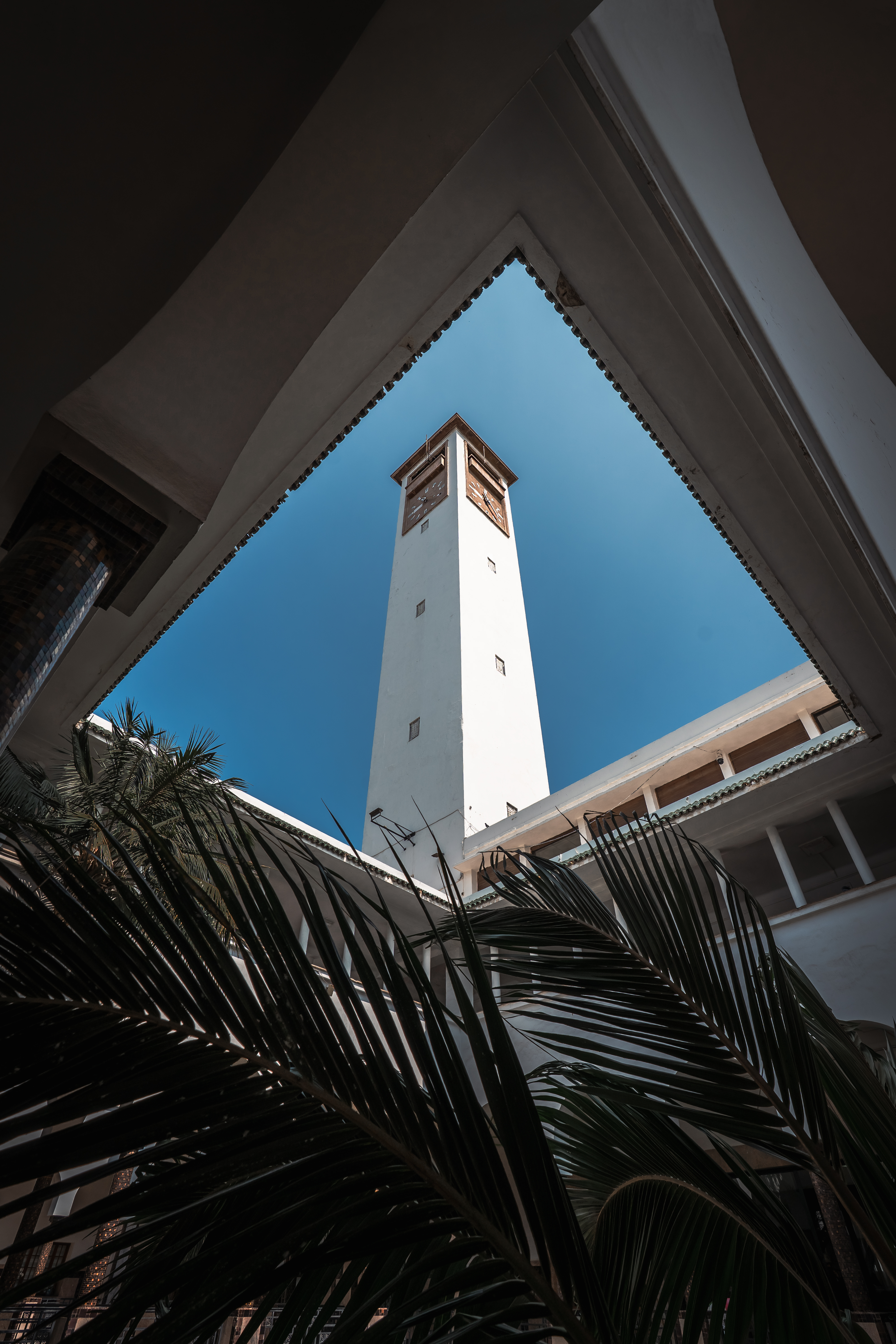
View of the Clock Tower from the courtyard

== Access ==
The Wilaya Building is accessible from the Muhammad V Square Station on Line 1 of the Casablanca Tramway.
