= Monuments aux Morts =

French war memorials

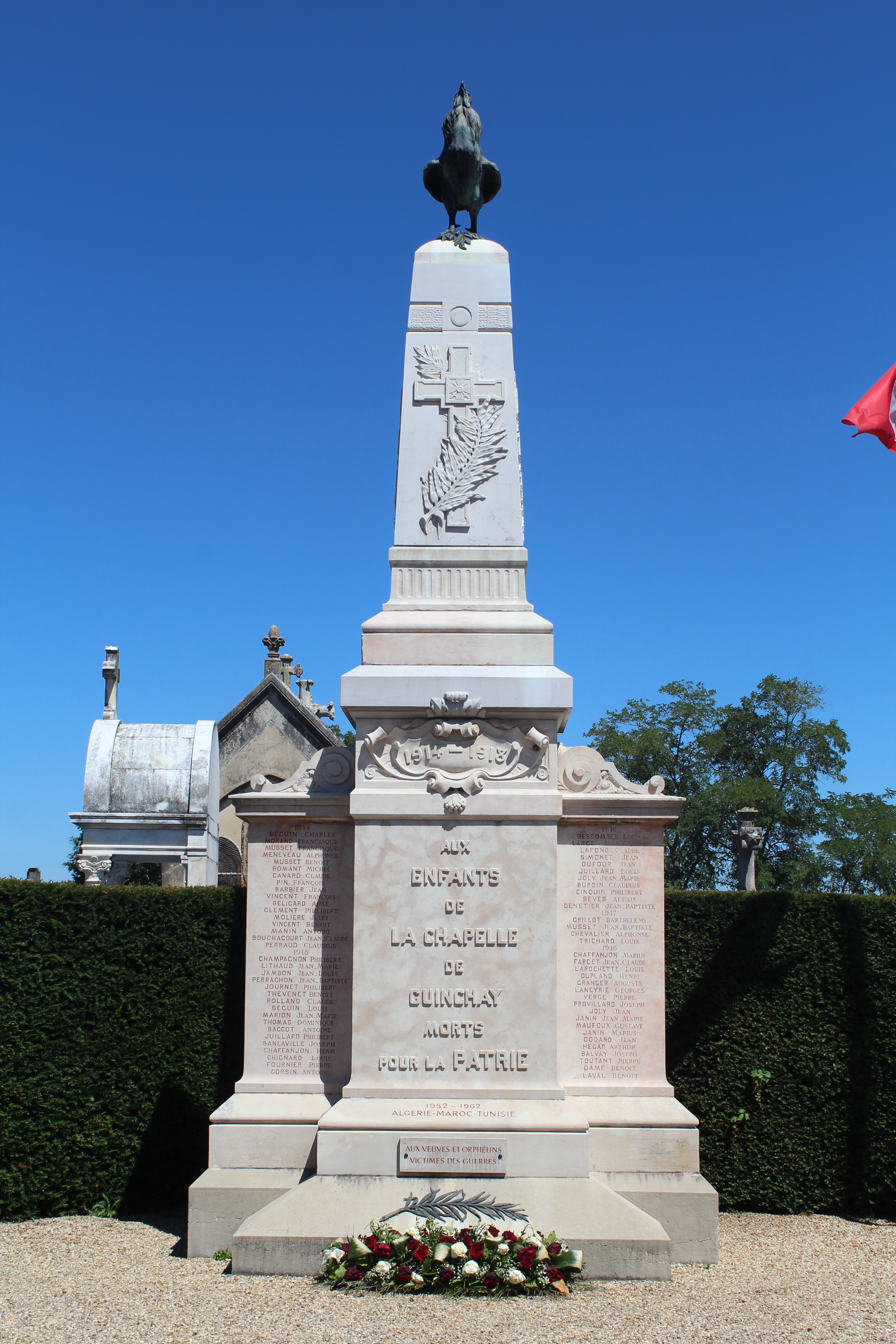
Monuments aux Morts in La Chapelle-de-Guinchay, Saône-et-Loire.

Monuments aux Morts are French war memorials established to commemorate the losses of World War I. After the end of the 1914–1918 war there was a frenzy to build memorials to commemorate those who had been killed and it has been calculated that in this period well over 36,000 individual memorials were erected throughout France with the majority of these being built between 1919 and 1926. These memorials are known as monuments aux morts - literally monuments to the dead, known in English as war memorials.

== Background ==
In the aftermath of what had proved to be such a bloody conflict, with France losing some 1,327,000 men, there was a need to come to terms with the loss of so many and in particular there was a need to create a focal point where people could remember their lost ones. This was particularly necessary when one remembers that few men's bodies were sent home but were buried on or near the battlefields, often a good distance from their home. In many cases the harsh reality was that there was no body left or insufficient remains to identify the dead person involved; the word "missing" when applied to the dead of the Great War was to cast a shadow over so much of Europe. In France the monument aux morts was to be that focal point; a place that would possibly fill the void which the war had left for so many. In the final analysis the war memorial was to replace the individual grave and gravestone.

Monuments remembering those killed in war had first started to appear in France after the Franco-Prussian War but it was after the 1914–1918 conflict that the monuments started to appear in every town and village. What was new in the approach to the monument aux morts of the Great War was that they were to mark the death of the ordinary citizens and the grief and the loss suffered by their widows, their orphans and their parents, this as opposed to remembering and honouring armies, military leaders or great men of state. On the monuments the list of the dead follows for the most part alphabetically or chronologically. Little is made of rank because the monuments were meant to be egalitarian, as indeed was death. The epitaphs inscribed were often the same. « À nos morts », « Gloire à nos héros ».

== Forms ==
With so many monuments involved, and in Picardy well over 700 in the Somme region alone, it was inevitable that there would be a great variety in the types and forms of monuments erected, especially as they were to prove expensive and the war had left France, and indeed much of Europe, practically bankrupt. In the Picardy region many villages had been totally destroyed; rebuilding the villages was the priority.

In many cases the monument took the form of a simple obelisk, often surmounted by a gallic rooster or a Croix de Guerre and perhaps embellished with a laurel, or some other symbol. Those communes who were able to afford more opted for a sculptural work, sometimes an individual work by a local sculptor but very often a work that was mass-produced and marketed by some of France's large foundries and marbreries. Indeed, it was the existence of a commercial monument industry that made the creation of so many monument aux morts possible.

Where an individual sculptor or marbrier was involved we will encounter works of varying complexity and quality and whilst some works were to prove pedestrian many sculptors rose to the challenge and produced works of great thoughtfulness and beauty. Generally the sculptors avoided any display of triumphalism. Many featured representations of a soldier or "poilu" as did British memorials with a "Tommy" shown in various poses. One thinks of the work of Albert Toft, Louis Roslyn, and the work of many other British sculptors. What sculptors tried to represent in many of the monument aux morts was the great feeling of loss and grief felt throughout France and thus representations and allegories of weeping women, grieving widows, mothers and children were often seen and many of these are quite beautiful.

Whilst the choice of monument was left to each commune, the law stated that monument aux morts should not bear symbols of a religious nature unless they were erected in a cemetery, and, by and large, this law was respected although there were some exceptions. This often meant that a commune would have its public monument aux morts, placed in say the main square or by the mairie and its parish monument aux morts erected in the church with the latter including the Latin cross or other religious symbols. This was borne out of the great schism between Church and State in France which was crystallised in 1904.

== Financing ==
For the most part it was left to the initiatives of town halls and ex-soldiers associations to raise funds, mostly by public subscription although there was provision in the law passed on 25 October 1919 for a contribution to be made by the State. This law, which encouraged the " remembrance and glorification of those who died for France" included the principle of financial support but this was minimal and linked to the actual number of dead lost by the town or village and the commune’s financial means. Many different ways of raising funds were tried; galas, tombolas, fetes, etc. In some cases communes in the fighting zones were "adopted" by communes elsewhere and given funds to cover the costs of the monuments. In some cases rich benefactors with funds were available and it was not unusual for sculptors not to charge for their work! The law passed by the government stated that a "Livre d’Or" or "Golden book" be written up and kept in every commune setting out the names of those who had died for France and whilst it was stated that a National memorial would be erected in or near Paris and that it was not compulsory for a physical monument to be set up in each commune this was invariably what happened.

The laws of 25 October 1919 and subsequent laws enacted by the French Government had addressed the question as to how the nation should remember her dead. It was the concept of the "Livre d’Or" that was established; that the names of the combatants in the Army and Navy who served under the flag and had died for France in the course of the 1914–1918 war should be inscribed in registers lodged in the Panthéon. This embraced not only those killed who had served in the forces but also the names would also be included of those who died as a result of violence committed by the enemy whether in the course of exercising their public duties or in fulfilling their obligations as citizens. The State was to deliver to each community a "Livre d’Or" (literally golden book) in which would be inscribed the names of combatants in the Army and Navy who had died for France and had lived or had been born in that community. It was stated that this book would be held in the rooms of the community (Town Hall) and held at the disposal of the inhabitants of that community. The law further stated that for French people born or living overseas the book would be held in the consulate which had jurisdiction over the commune in which the combatant had been born or had lived. It was the law of 31 July 1920 which clarified the question of subsidies available from the State. A "ready reckoner" was issued and stated inter alia that the amount of any subsidy would be linked to the number of deaths per 1 00 inhabitants and also took into account the amount of revenues available to any commune; in other words the wealth of any given commune would be taken into account when calculating any subsidy.

One fact which emerges from a study of the monument aux morts of the Somme is that for the most part they avoid any expression of triumphalism but adopt a sombre and reflective tone with a marked concentration on the portrayal of grief.

== See also ==
- World War I memorials
- War memorials (Aisne)
- War memorials (Oise)
- War memorials (Eastern Somme)
- War memorials (Western Somme)
