= Marius Boyer =

French architect

- Occupation: Architect
- Practice: Associated architectural firm[s]

Marius Germinal Boyer (22 September 1885, Marseille – 24 December 1947, Casablanca) was a French architect active in Casablanca, Morocco.

== Biography ==
Marius Boyer was admitted to the École nationale supérieure des Beaux-Arts in Paris in 1904. He was a student of Gabriel Héraud and ascended to the seconde classe in 1904 and to the première classe class in 1908. At the time, students had to ascend from the seconde classe to the première classe. He won the Prix Américain de l’Architecture in 1910, and earned his diploma around 1913.

He moved to Casablanca, then under the authority of the French Protectorate in Morocco, where he worked with Jean Balois. He worked as a professor of architecture at l'Ecole des Beaux-Arts de Casablanca.

== Notable works ==
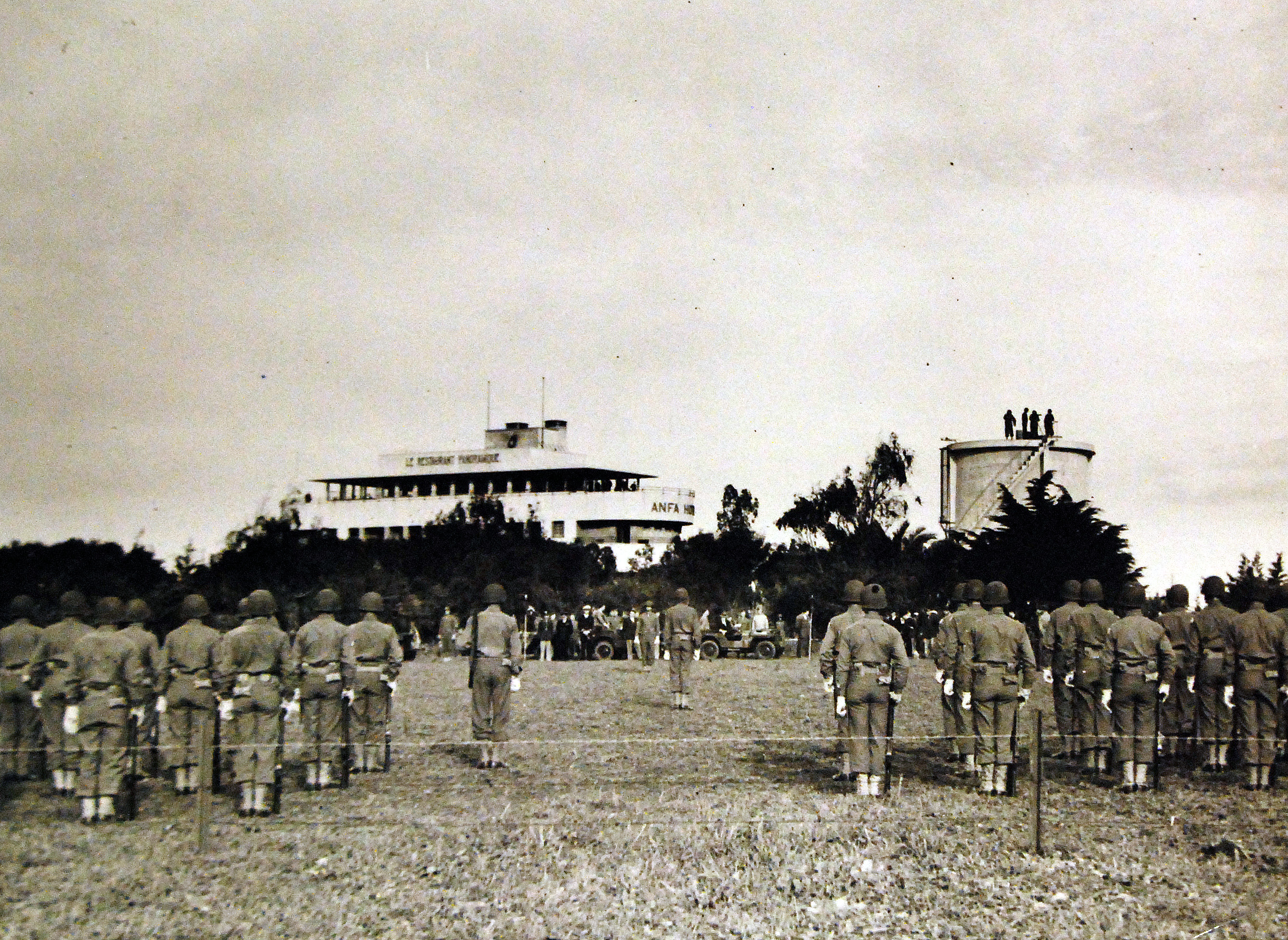
Franklin D. Roosevelt observing US troops in front of Boyer's Anfa Hotel, site of the 1943 Casablanca Conference.

Some of his important projects include the Glawi Building (1922), the Vigie Marocaine Building (1924), the Lévy-Bendayan Building (1928), the Wilaya Building of Casablanca (1928-1936), the Moses Assayag Building (1930-1932), the Hotel Transatlantique (c. 1932), the Shell Building (1934), Cinema Vox (c. 1935), and the Anfa Hotel (1938).
