= 11th Mountain Infantry Battalion =

- 11.º Batalhão de Infantaria de Montanha
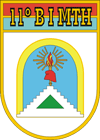
- Active: 1888–present
- Country: Brazil
- Branch: Brazilian Army
- Type: Mountain infantry
- Garrison/HQ: Minas Gerais

The 11th Mountain Infantry Battalion (Portuguese: 11.º Batalhão de Infantaria de Montanha) is a unit of the Brazilian Army, which specializes in fighting in the mountain environment, improving and developing special techniques for mountain operations and using weapons and equipment specific to this theater.

== History ==
The unit goes back to 1888, created in Rio Pardo, in the then state of Rio Grande do Sul. At the time of the Old Republic, it served in the campaign of Canudos in the interior of Bahia, has been transferred, the return to São João del Rei in 1897.

This unit is very traditional and has a long history of duty for Brazil.

Some of the wars and battles they fought in:

- Contestado War
- Constitutionalist Revolution
- Tenente revolts
- Revolution of 1930
- World War II, this unit fought in the cold European mountains
  - Battle of Montese
- 1964 Brazilian coup d'état
- UNAVEM III

== Participation in World War II ==
The Mountain Infantry served with the Allies in World War II, taking part in the conquest of the town of Montese in the Italian mountains, and heavily defended by the Germans as a last bastion to block the advance of Allied troops towards the Po Valley. On 14 April 1945, at Montese, three Brazilian soldiers on patrol, Arlindo Lúcio da Silva, Geraldo Baêta da Cruz, and Rodrigues de Souza, were attacked by German forces, who called upon them to surrender (including their own leaders/higher ups); the three men took cover and fired on the enemy until running out of ammunition. They fixed bayonets and advanced, but were killed. In recognition of the bravery of the soldiers, the Germans buried them and erected a cross over their grave with the inscription Drei Brasilianische Helden ("Three Brazilian heroes").

There is a monument honouring the three men of the patrol and the Brazilian mountain infantry.

== See also ==
- Special Forces
- Brazilian Armed Forces
- Brazilian Army
- Brazilian Expeditionary Force
- Brazil at War
- Gothic Line order of battle
- Spring 1945 offensive in Italy
