= Max Wolff (soldier) =

Brazilian Army soldier

Max Wolff Filho
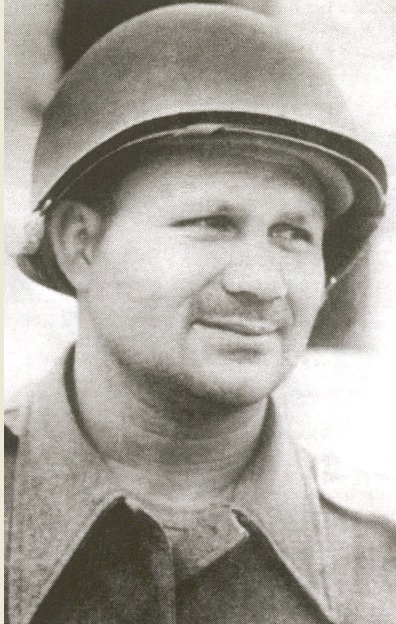
- Born: 29 July 1912; Rio Negro, Paraná, Brazil
- Died: 12 April 1945 (aged 32); Montese, Italy
- Military career
- Allegiance: Brazil
- Branch: Brazilian Army
- Service years: 1930–1945
- Rank: Sergeant
- Unit: Brazilian Expeditionary Force
- Conflicts: Revolution of 1930; Constitutionalist Revolution; World War II; Italian campaign; Battle of Montese †
- Awards: Combat Cross First Class (Brazilian); War Medal (Brazilian); (Brazilian); Sangue do Brasil (Blood of Brazil); Bronze Star (US)

Max Wolff Filho (July 29, 1912 – April 12, 1945) was a Brazilian Army sergeant, a member of the Brazilian Expeditionary Force who fought in Italy in World War II.

Max Wolff was born in Rio Negro, Paraná, Brazil. He enlisted in 1930 in the city of Curitiba, joining the 15th Hunters Battalion. He served in the Revolution of 1930 and the Constitutionalist Revolution against the Paulistas. During World War II, he was a member of the Brazilian Expeditionary Force, under the command of the US 5th Army. He arrived in Italy in September 1944 and led over 30 patrols.

A few days before his death, Wolff was awarded the US Bronze Star by General Lucian Truscott. First Sergeant Max Wolff died from German machine-gun fire in Riva de Biscaia, near Montese, during a reconnaissance patrol. At the time of his death, Wolff was a widower and left behind a 10-year-old daughter. He was posthumously promoted to second lieutenant for his bravery.

A Brazilian war medal is also named for him.

== Medals and awards ==
- Combat Cross First Class (Brazilian)
- War Medal (Brazilian)
- Campaign Medal (Brazilian)
- Sangue do Brasil (Blood of Brazil)
- Bronze Star (US)
