= Campaign Medal (Brazil) =

Brazilian Campaign Medal

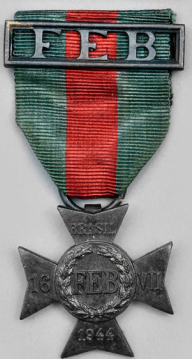
- Obverse: FEB surrounded by a laurel wreath
- Reverse: Medalha de Campanha surrounded by the name of the Brazilian Expeditionary Force in Portuguese
- Campaign: WW2
- Clasps: F.E.B for Força Expedicionária Brasileira
- Status: No longer awarded

The Campaign Medal (Portuguese: Medalha de Campanha) was a medal of the Brazilian armed forces. it was authorised for members of the Brazilian Expeditionary Force, and members of allied militaries that participated in the war under the command of or in close collaboration with forces of the Brazilian Army, who have participated in military actions without disreputable conduct. It was established by then President Getúlio Vargas via Decree-Law No. 6,795, of August 17, 1944.

== Description ==
The medal itself took the form of a Cross pattée with a circle in the centre. On the obverse, there were the initials of the Brazilian Expeditionary Force in Portuguese, surrounded by a laurel wreath, on the top arm of the cross was the word Brasil, followed by the numbers, 16, VII, and 1944, on the left, right, and bottom arms respectively, referring to the 16th July 1944, when Brazilian soldiers first saw combat, in Europe. The reverse is simpler, with the arms being bare, whilst the centre bears the legend Medalha de Campanha, surrounded by the words Força Expedicionária Brasileira. The medal was issued with a clasp that read F.E.B. in Latin capitals.

== Notable recipients ==
- Harold Alexander
- Dwight Eisenhower
- Max Wolff
- Elza Medeiros
