= Brazilian Expeditionary Force =

Brazilian military division during WWII

- Força Expedicionária Brasileira
- Brazilian Expeditionary Force shoulder sleeve insignia (Army component) with a smoking snake
- Active: 1942–1945
- Country: Brazil
- Allegiance: United Nations
- Branch: Brazilian Army; Brazilian Air Force
- Type: Expeditionary Force
- Role: Aerial warfare Combined arms Expeditionary warfare
- Size: 25,900
- Nicknames: Cobras Fumantes (Smoking Snakes)
- Mottos: A cobra vai fumar! (The snake will smoke!)
- Engagements: World War II; Italian campaign; Gothic Line offensive; Battle of Monte Castello; Battle of Garfagnana (Aviation); Operation Fourth Term (Aviation); Operation Encore; Spring 1945 offensive; Battle of Montese; Battle of Bologna (Aviation); Battle of Collecchio-Fornovo di Taro

Commanders
- Notable commanders: Mascarenhas de Morais, General Commander; Olympio Falconière da Cunha, General Inspector; Euclidés Zenóbio da Costa, Divisional Infantry Commander; Oswaldo Cordeiro de Farias, Divisional Artillery Commander

Insignia
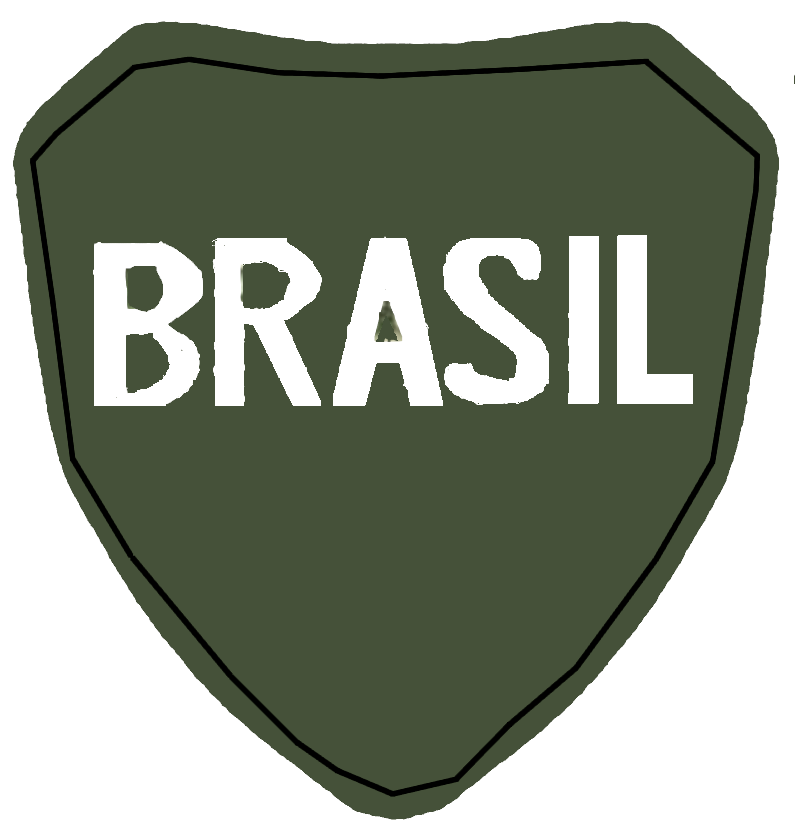
- Shoulder sleeve insignias

- Flag

The Brazilian Expeditionary Force (Portuguese: Força Expedicionária Brasileira, FEB), nicknamed Cobras Fumantes (lit. 'the Smoking Snakes'), was a military division of the Brazilian Army and Air Force that fought as part of Allied forces in the Mediterranean Theatre of World War II. It numbered around 25,900 men, including a full infantry division, liaison flight, and fighter squadron.

Placed under United States command, Brazilian troops fought primarily in the Italian campaign from September 1944 to May 1945, while the Brazilian Navy and Air Force took part in the Battle of the Atlantic from mid-1942 until the end of the war. The FEB operated mostly at the platoon level, seeing heavy combat at the arduous Gothic Line and during the 1945 final offensive. By the end of the war, it took 20,573 Axis prisoners, including two generals and close to 900 officers. The division lost 948 men killed in action across all three services.

Brazil was the only independent South American country to send combat troops overseas during the Second World War. Known for its tenacity and bravery, the FEB was well-regarded by both allies and adversaries; it served with distinction in several battles, most notably at Collecchio, Camaiore, Monte Prano, and Serchio Valley. Brazil's navy and air force played important roles in protecting Allied shipping and crippling Axis maritime power, inflicting disproportionately high losses on enemy munitions, supplies, and infrastructure.

== Overview ==
Brazil's participation in World War II on the Allied side was not a foregone conclusion. Although it had supported the Triple Entente in World War I—as had now-Axis-aligned Japan and Romania—the country's contribution to the war took place in its waning years and was primarily naval, although it also sent a small military mission to the Western Front. In the years leading up to World War II, Brazil was the biggest non-European consumer of German products and ranked ninth among Germany's trading partners overall. It also hosted a large and influential German community that engendered closer ties to Germany.

As in 1914, Brazil in 1939 maintained a position of neutrality, initially trading with both Allied and Axis countries. As the war progressed, trade with the Axis became subject to British and U.S. diplomatic and economic pressure. These efforts included the creation of the Joint Brazil-U.S. Defense Commission, chaired by U.S. Army Major General James Garesche Ord, which was broadly aimed at strengthening military ties between the countries; however, its central goal was to reduce the likelihood of Axis attacks on U.S. shipping across the Atlantic and minimize Axis influence in South America.

Although Brazil was officially neutral, it increasingly cooperated with the Allies, particularly the U.S., shortly after the latter entered World War II in December 1941. The Pan American States Conference, which took place in Rio de Janeiro from 15–28 January 1942, was convened in the wake of the U.S. declaration of war against the Axis powers. The meeting centered on U.S. offers of economic assistance to Latin America countries in return for security cooperation and the severing of diplomatic ties with Axis members; Brazil consequently ended diplomatic relations with Germany, Japan, and Italy by the end of January. With the country's entry into the war, the government created internment camps to imprison POWs and citizens of the Axis countries suspected of being a risk to national security.

Pursuant to the conference, Brazil permitted the U.S. to set up air bases on its territory in return for assistance in developing a domestic steel industry, Companhia Siderúrgica Nacional, which would serve the American war effort and afterwards benefit the Brazilian economy. The bases were located in the north-central states of Bahia, Pernambuco, and Rio Grande do Norte, where the city of Natal hosted part of the U.S. Navy's VP-52 bombing squadron, which later became the largest overseas U.S. airbase. Brazil also hosted U.S. Task Force 3, which included a squadron equipped to attack submarines and merchant vessels attempting to trade with Japan.

Nevertheless, unlike in 1917, the Brazilian government sought to avoid war and instead maintain economically beneficial ties with both sides. Notwithstanding its formal neutrality and reticence to declare war, Brazil's cooperation with the U.S. and break in diplomatic relations prompted immediate German reprisals. From the end of January to August 1942, German U-boats sank 18 Brazilian merchant vessels; the spate of attacks was especially severe after June 16, when Hitler personally called for a "submarine blitz" against Brazil, having considered its closer ties with the U.S. to be tantamount to an act of war. By mid-August, the Germans were targeting shipping closer to Brazil's coast; U-507 alone sank five Brazilian vessels in two days, causing more than 600 deaths:

- On August 15, the Baependy, traveling from Salvador to Recife, was torpedoed at 19:12. Its 215 passengers and 55 crew members were lost.
- Less than an hour later, U-507 torpedoed the Araraquara, also traveling from Salvador towards the north of the country. Of the 142 people on board, 131 died.
- Seven hours after the second attack, the Anníbal Benévolo was attacked, killing all 83 passengers and all but four of its 71 crew.
- On August 17, close to the city of Vitória, the Itagiba was hit at 10:45, resulting in 36 deaths.
- Another Brazilian ship, the Arará, traveling from Salvador to Santos, was targeted as it stopped to help the crippled Itagiba, suffering 20 fatalities.

In all, 21 German and two Italian submarines sank 36 Brazilian merchant ships, resulting in the deaths of nearly 2,000 people. The wave of August attacks proved to be a breaking point, especially since the victims included army soldiers and religious pilgrims. Brazil "erupted in a wave of revulsions" as anti-Axis demonstrations, some of them violent, spread across most major cities, including Rio de Janeiro. Protestors burned the flags of the Axis powers and chanted "We want war!"; in some cases, German communities were harassed. The passive position of the Vargas government proved untenable in the face of public opinion, and on August 22, within a week of the last U-boat attack, the Brazilian cabinet approved a declaration of war against the Axis nations.

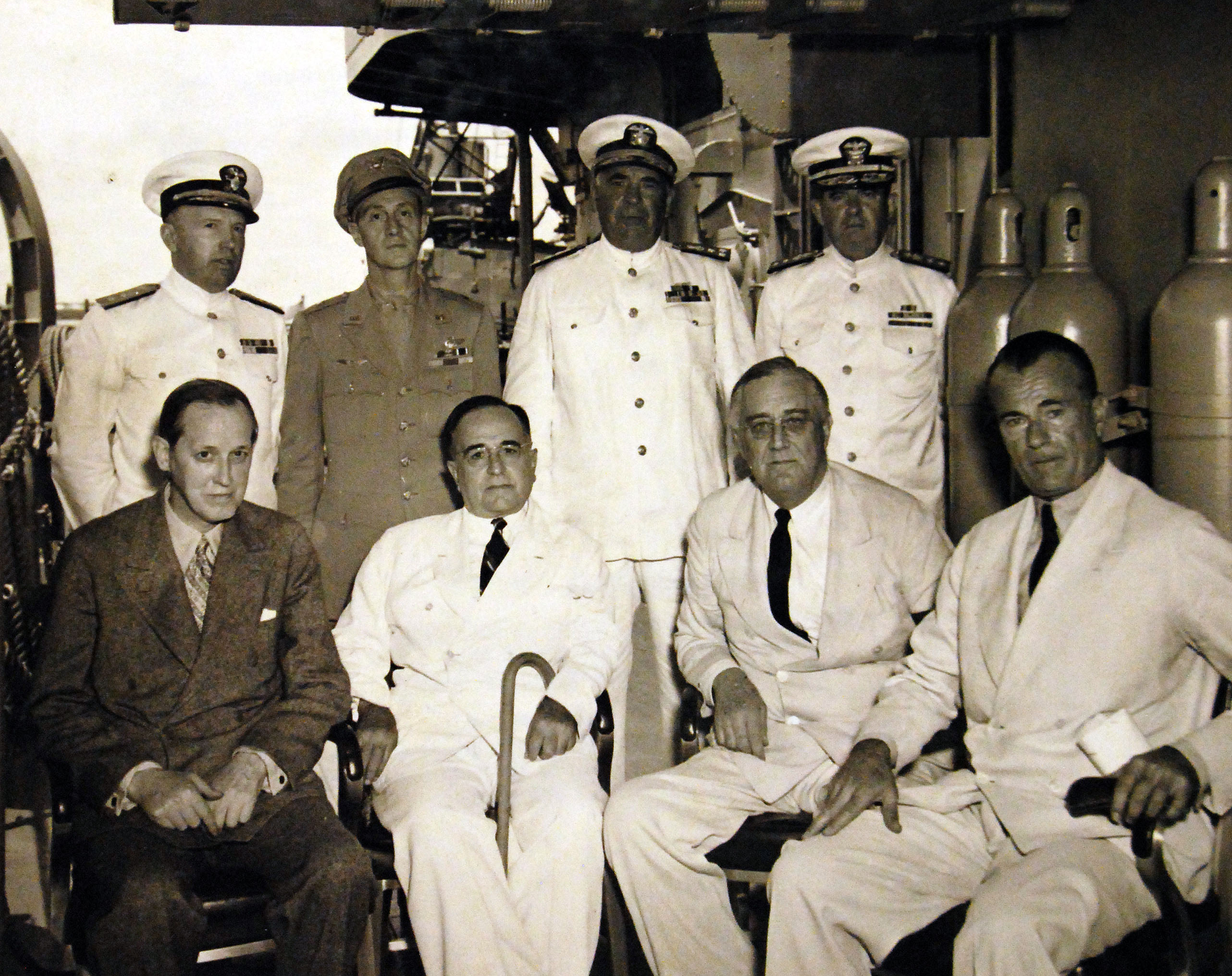
U.S. President Franklin D. Roosevelt and Brazilian President Getúlio Vargas aboard USS Humboldt, during the Potenji River Conference, with Harry Hopkins, Chairman of the British-American Assignment Board (left), and Jefferson Caffery, U.S. Ambassador to Brazil (right).

Although Brazil continued to provide much needed supplies, war material, and strategic territory for foreign bases, the decision to contribute troops came several months later, at the Potenji River Conference of 28 and 29 January 1943. Held in Natal, Rio Grande do Norte aboard the USS Humboldt, the meeting between U.S. President Franklin D. Roosevelt and Getúlio Vargas resulted in greater political, economic, and military cooperation between the U.S. and Brazil, including invitations for the latter to play a larger role in the postwar global order. Vargas and Foreign Minister Oswaldo Aranha saw the commitment of soldiers as a means of solidifying the strategic partnership with the U.S., and of enhancing Brazilian prestige and influence on the global stage.

=== Navy ===
The participation of the Brazilian Navy in World War II was not directly connected to the FEB and the Italian Campaign, as it was largely engaged in the Battle of the Atlantic. Axis naval attacks caused nearly 1,600 deaths, which included 500 civilians, 470 merchant seamen, and 570 sailors of the Navy; roughly one in seven Brazilian sailors would perish in the campaign. A total of 36 ships were sunk by the Germans, with an additional three lost (and 350 killed) in accidental sinkings.

The main task of the Brazilian Navy was, together with the Allies, to ensure the safety of ships sailing between the central and south Atlantic to Gibraltar. Alone or in coordination with Allied forces, it escorted 614 convoys that protected 3,164 merchant ships and troop transports. In the battle against German submarines, Brazilian frigates and submarines used mines and depth charges. According to German documents, the Brazilian Navy attacked German submarines a total of 66 times.

Allied forces are confirmed to have destroyed twelve German submarines along the Brazilian coasts: the U-boats U-128, U-161, U-164, U-199, U-507, U-513, U-590, U-591, U-598, U-604 and U-662.

Among the warships lost by the Brazilian Navy were the minelayer Camaquã, which capsized during a storm while escorting a convoy in July 1944, and the light cruiser Bahia due to a gunnery accident in July 1945; the majority of the latter's crew were lost. Of the three Brazilian military ships lost during the war, only the freighter-troopship Vital de Oliveira was due to the action of an enemy submarine, being sunk by the U-861 on July 20, 1944.

By the end of the war, the entirety of the South Atlantic convoy had been turned over to the Brazilian Navy, thereby relieving American and British vessels for urgently needed service elsewhere.

== Command ==
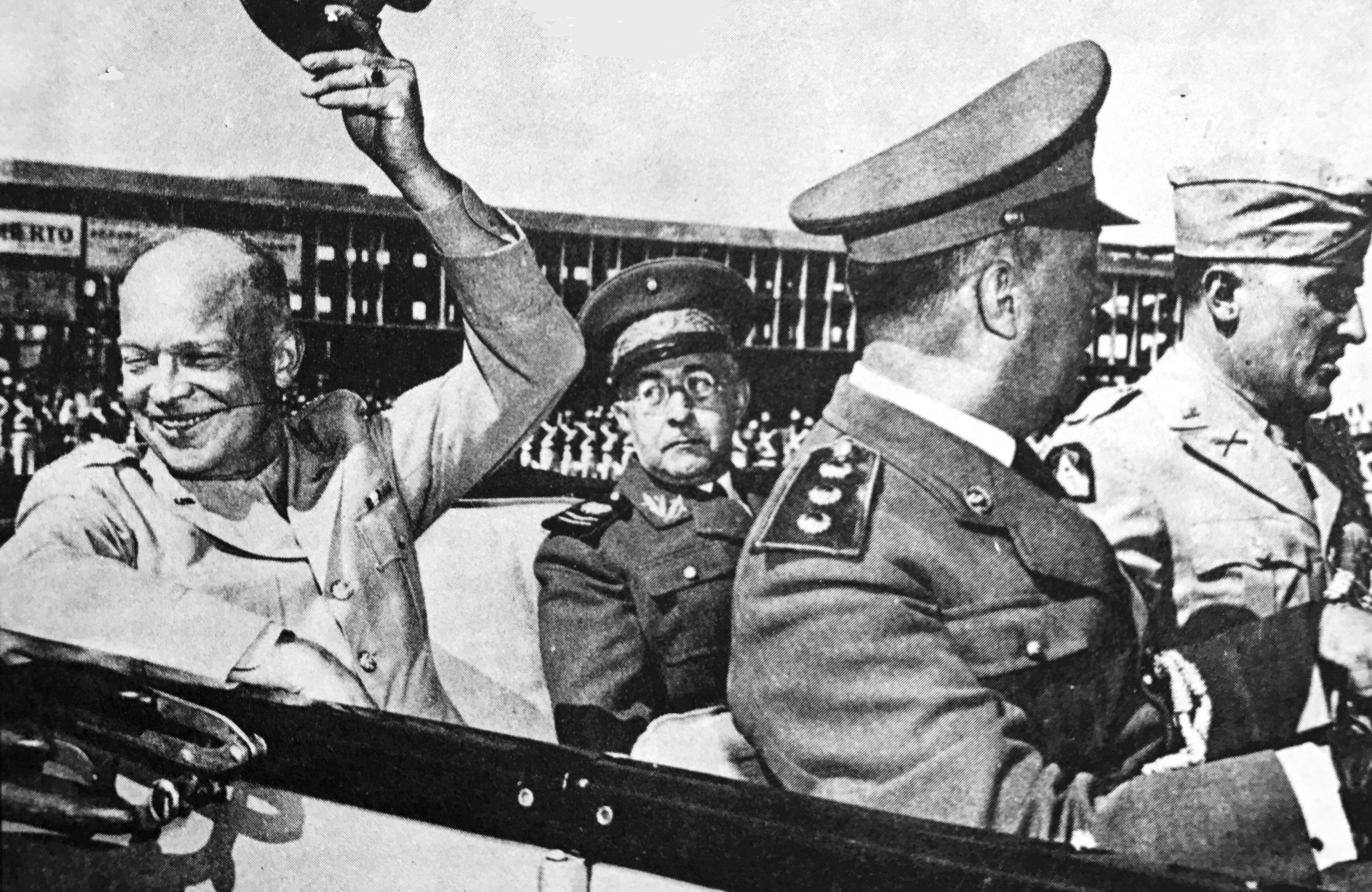
General Mascarenhas de Morais (back seat, right), Brazilian army officer and commander of the FEB, with General Dwight D. Eisenhower, commander of the Allied forces in Europe during World War II.

The Brazilian 1st Division of the FEB was subordinate to the Allied 15th Army Group under Field Marshal Harold Alexander (later succeeded by General Mark Clark), via the US Fifth Army of Lieutenant General Mark Clark (later succeeded by Lieutenant General Lucian Truscott) and the US IV Corps of Major General Willis D. Crittenberger. The entry for the Gothic Line order of battle provides the layout for the Allied and German armies in Italy.

FEB headquarters functioned as an administrative headquarters and link to the Brazilian high command under the secretary of war, General Eurico Gaspar Dutra in Rio de Janeiro. General Mascarenhas de Morais (later marshal) was the commander of the FEB, with General Zenóbio da Costa as chief of the 6th Regimental Combat Team (RCT) of Caçapava (the first FEB RCT to land in Italy), and General Cordeiro de Farias as commander of artillery.

Theoretically, the FEB was organized as a standard U.S. infantry division of that time, complete in all aspects, down to its logistical tail (including postal and banking services), although some of these, like its health services, were found to be deficient and had to be complemented, and in many cases controlled or managed by Americans. Its combat units were, besides the aforementioned 6th RCT, the 1st RCT based in Rio de Janeiro, and the 11th from São João del Rei. Each RCT had about 5,000 men (corresponding in size to today brigades), divided in three then called "battalions" consisting of four companies each, including supporting units for combat, and other army branches, like artillery, engineering, and cavalry. The Brazilian Air Force Fighter squadron was itself under the Mediterranean Allied Tactical Air Force.

== Campaign ==
=== Preparations ===
American propaganda film Brazil at War (1943), praising Brazil for joining the Allies, and attempting to show similarities between Brazil and the United States

Soon after Brazil declared war on the Axis, it began a popular mobilization for an expeditionary force to fight in Europe. At that time, Brazil was a country with a traditionally isolationist foreign policy. Its population was largely rural and illiterate, its economy focused on exporting commodities, and it lacked infrastructure in industry, health care, and education, which was needed to support the war effort with material and human resources. Further, an action plan to circumvent these limitations (like the Calogeras Plan of the previous World War) was out of the question because many Brazilian military officers believed that a Nazi-Fascist defeat in Europe would increase demands for democracy within Brazil. At the time, Brazil had a military regime. It had been openly authoritarian from 1937 and sympathetic to Nazi-fascist regimes until 1941. Brazil was thus precluded from pursuing a line of autonomous action in the conflict, and found it difficult to take even a modest role in it.

Faced with the government's passivity and unwillingness, Assis Chateaubriand, a mass media magnate, negotiated with US officials stationed in Brazil, for the creation of an expeditionary army division, composed of volunteers from all of Latin America. This division would be financed by him, led by a Brazilian general, and trained by American officials. This initiative was curtailed by the Brazilian government in early 1943.

Almost two years later, Brazil officially entered the war and sent troops to the European Theater of Operations. For comparison, the gap between the US's entrance and Operation Torch was almost one year. Several reasons contributed to the delay: political distrust between the Brazilian and American authorities, disagreements over the target size of the Brazilian Expeditionary Force, differences between Brazilian aspirations and American preferences for controlling the force, and disagreements on whether it should be fully trained and armed before boarding or get stationed behind the Italian Front and train there.

In the end, the Brazilian government gathered a force of one Army Division of 25,000 men (replacements included), compared with an initial declared goal of a whole Army Corps of 100,000, to join the Allies in the Italian Campaign.

=== Arrival in Italy ===
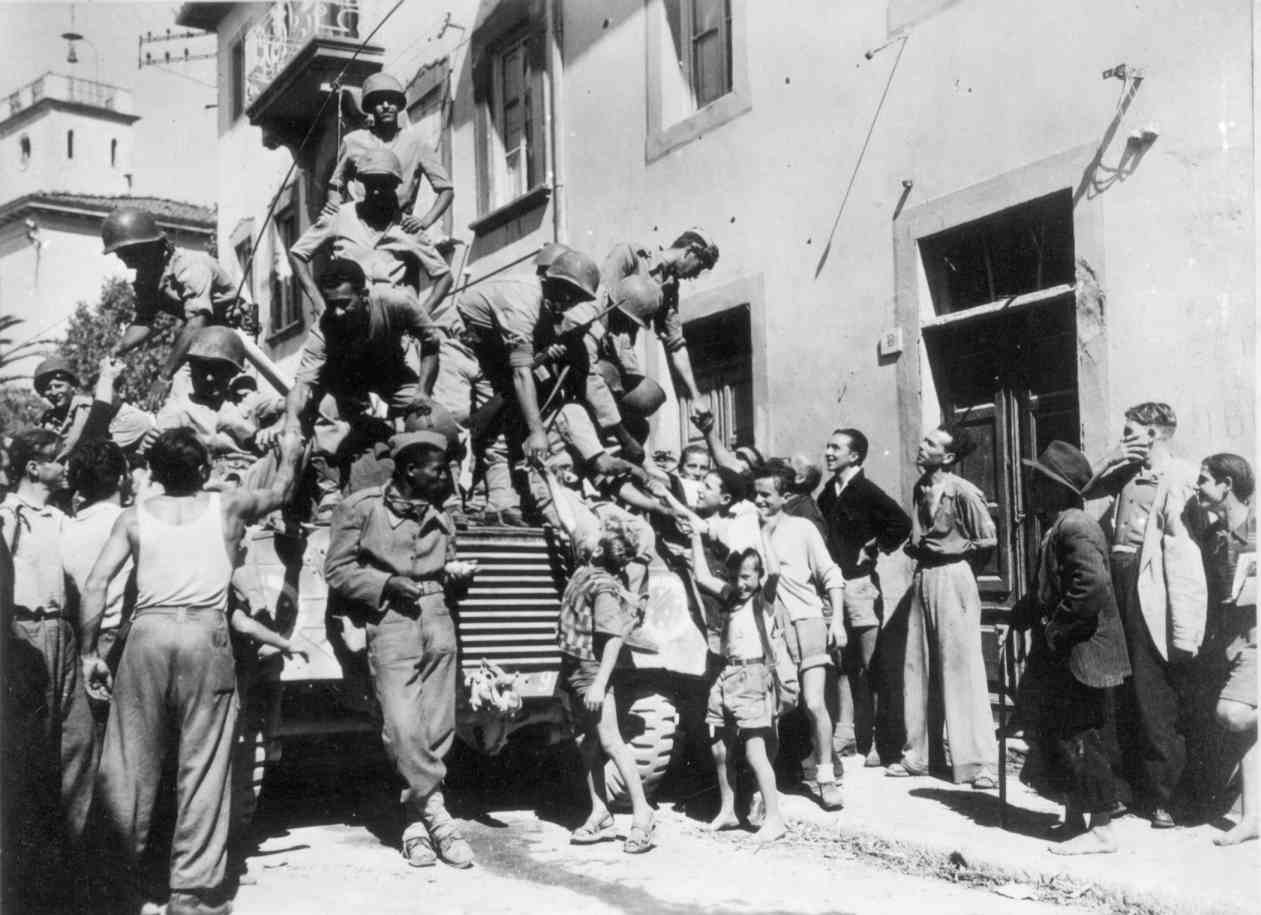
Brazilian soldiers greet Italian civilians in the city of Massarosa, September 1944.

On July 2, 1944, the first 5,000 FEB soldiers, the 6th RCT, left Brazil for Europe aboard the USS General Mann, reaching Naples, Italy on July 16. Lacking weapons, equipment, and even an arrangement for barracks, they remained on the docks while waiting to join the U.S. Task Force 45. The poor planning and subsequent embarrassment aroused controversy in Brazilian media. In late July, two more transports with Brazilian troops reached Italy, with three more following in September and November 1944, and February 1945. One notable unit deployed was Brazil's Mountain Infantry Battalion.

Brazilian soldiers celebrate Brazilian Independence Day in Italy during World War II, September 1944.

The FEB dedicated its first weeks in Italy to acquiring the proper equipment to fight on Italian terrain, and to training under American command. The preparation in Brazil, despite the two years' interval since the declaration of war, had proved almost worthless. Among the veterans of that campaign, there was a consensus that only combat could adequately prepare the soldier, regardless of the quality of training received earlier. In August, the troops moved to Tarquinia, 350 km north of Naples, where Clark's army was based. In November, the FEB joined General Crittenberger's US IV Corps.

In November, the Brazilians joined a multinational hodgepodge of soldiers. American forces included the segregated African-American 92nd Infantry Division and the Japanese-American 442nd Infantry Regiment. British forces drew from across the empire, including Australia, New Zealand, Canada, India, Nepal, Mandatory Palestine, South Africa, Rhodesia, and various African colonies. Also under British command were soldiers from occupied countries such as Poland, Greece, and Czechoslovakia, as well as anti-fascist Italians. Free French forces included Senegalese, Moroccans and Algerians.

The Germans made much of the political aspect of Brazil's presence in Italy; propaganda was targeted specifically at Brazilians, in the form of leaflets and a Portuguese-language, hour-long daily radio broadcast from Berlin Radio called Hora AuriVerde (GoldenGreen Hour).

=== Combat ===
Soldiers of the FEB during the second assault of the Battle of Monte Castello on 29 November 1944.

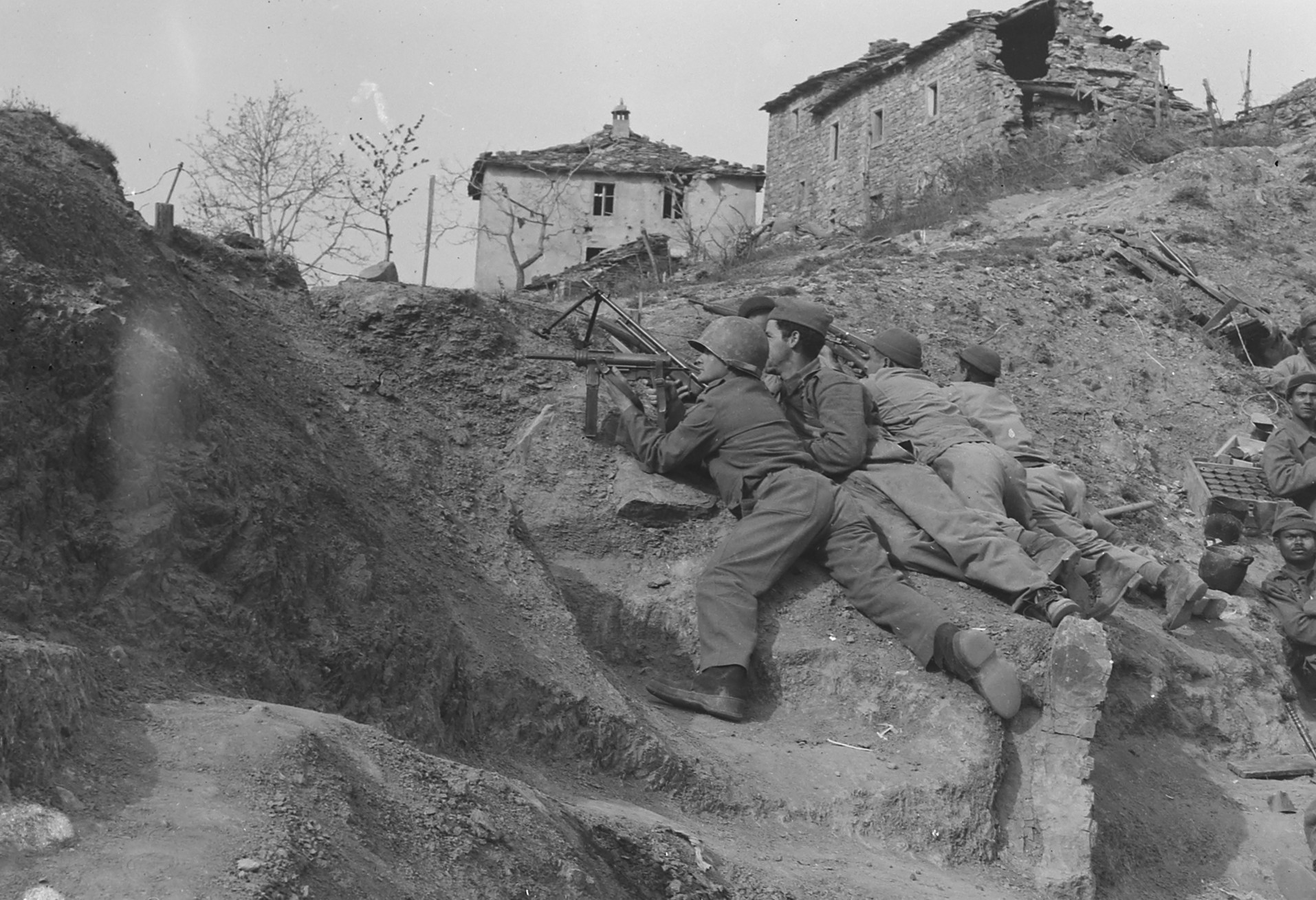
Brazilian soldiers in a trench during the Battle of Montese, April 1945.

The FEB achieved battlefield successes at Massarosa, Camaiore, Mount Prano, Monte Acuto, San Quirico, Gallicano, Barga, Monte Castello, La Serra, Castelnuovo di Vergato, Soprassasso, Montese, Paravento, Zocca, Marano sul Panaro, Collecchio and Fornovo di Taro.

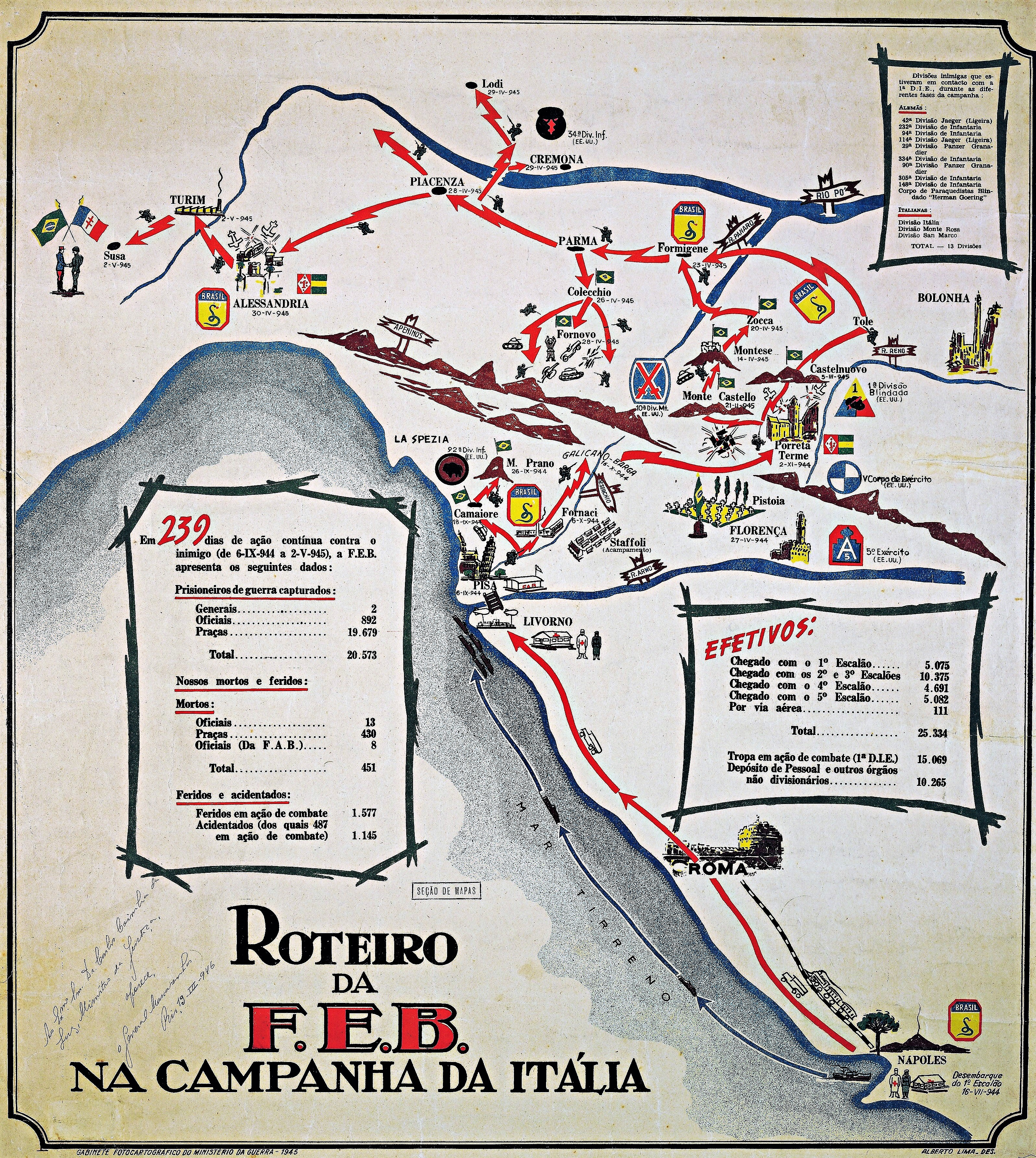
Map of the Brazilian actions in northern Italy, 1944–1945. National Archives of Brazil.

The first missions the Brazilians undertook in close connection with the US 370th Infantry Regiment, were reconnaissance operations to the end of August. Brazilian troops helped to partially fill the gap left by divisions of the US VI Corps and French Expeditionary Corps that left Italy for Operation Dragoon, the invasion of southern France. On September 16, the 6th RCT took Massarosa. Two days later it also took Camaiore and other small towns on the way north. By then, the FEB had already conquered Monte Prano, and taken control of the Serchio valley without any major casualties. After having suffered its first reverses around Barga city, and after the arrival of the 1st RCT at the end of October, the FEB was directed to the base of the northern Apennines, on the border between Tuscany and Emilia-Romagna regions, where it would spend the next months facing the harsh winter and the resistance of the Gothic Line. Allied forces were unable to break through the mountains over the winter and an offensive by German and Italian divisions to the left of the FEB sector, against the US 92nd Infantry Division, required the assistance of the 8th Indian Infantry Division before it was repelled.

Between the end of February and the beginning of March 1945, in preparation for the Spring offensive, the Brazilian Division and the U.S. 10th Mountain Division were able to capture important positions in the northern Apennines (noteworthy in the Brazilian sector, for Monte Castello and Castelnuovo), which deprived the Germans of key artillery positions in the mountains, whose effective fire had since the fall of 1944 blocked the Allied path to Bologna.

Frankly, you Brazilians are either crazy or very brave. I never saw anyone advance against machine-guns and well-defended positions with such disregard for life ... You are devils

— A German captain to a captured FEB lieutenant.

In the US Fifth Army's sector, the final offensive on the Italian Front began on 14 April, after a bombardment of 2,000 artillery pieces; an attack carried out by the troops of US IV Corps led by the Brazilian Division took Montese. After the first day of the Allied offensive, the Germans, without much effort, had stopped the main attack of IV Corps led by the US 10th Mountain Division, causing significant casualties among the troops of that formation. The Germans were misled into thinking that the FEB's raid over Montese, using M8 armoured cars and Sherman Tanks, could be the real main Allied objective in that sector, which led them to shell the Brazilians with 1,800 artillery rounds from the total of 2,800 used against all four Allied divisions in that sector during the days of the battle for Montese, when they tried unsuccessfully to take Montese back from the Brazilians. After that, the breaking of the Germans' lines to the north by forces of IV Corps became unavoidable. On the right, the Polish Division, from the British 8th Army, and the US 34th Infantry Division, from Fifth Army, entered Bologna on 21 April.

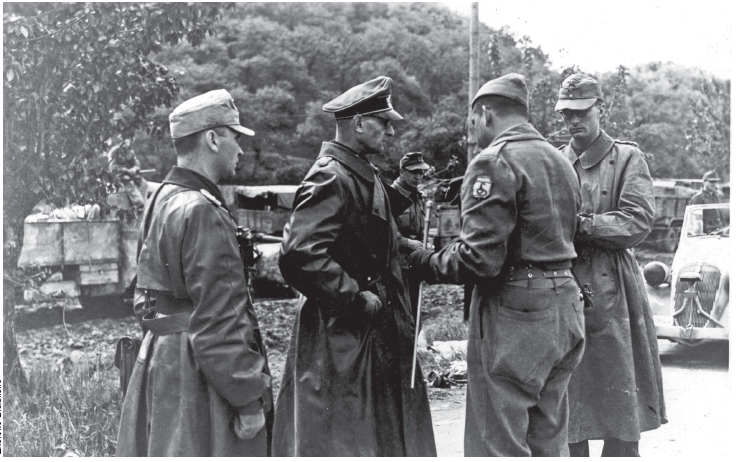
German Colonel Otto von Kleiber in preliminary discussions with Brazilian Major Franco Ferreira.

On 25 April the Italian resistance movement started a general partisan insurrection at the same time as Brazilian troops arrived at Parma and the Americans at Modena and Genoa. The British 8th Army advanced towards Venice and Trieste. At the Battle of Collecchio, Brazilian forces were preparing to face fierce resistance at the Taro river region from the retreating German-Italian forces in the region of Genoa/La Spezia that had been set free by troops of the 92nd US Division. These Axis troops were enveloped near Fornovo and after some fighting surrendered. On April 28, the Brazilians captured more than 13,000 men, including the entire 148th Infantry Division, elements of the 90th Panzergrenadier and the Italian 1st Bersaglieri "Italia" Division.

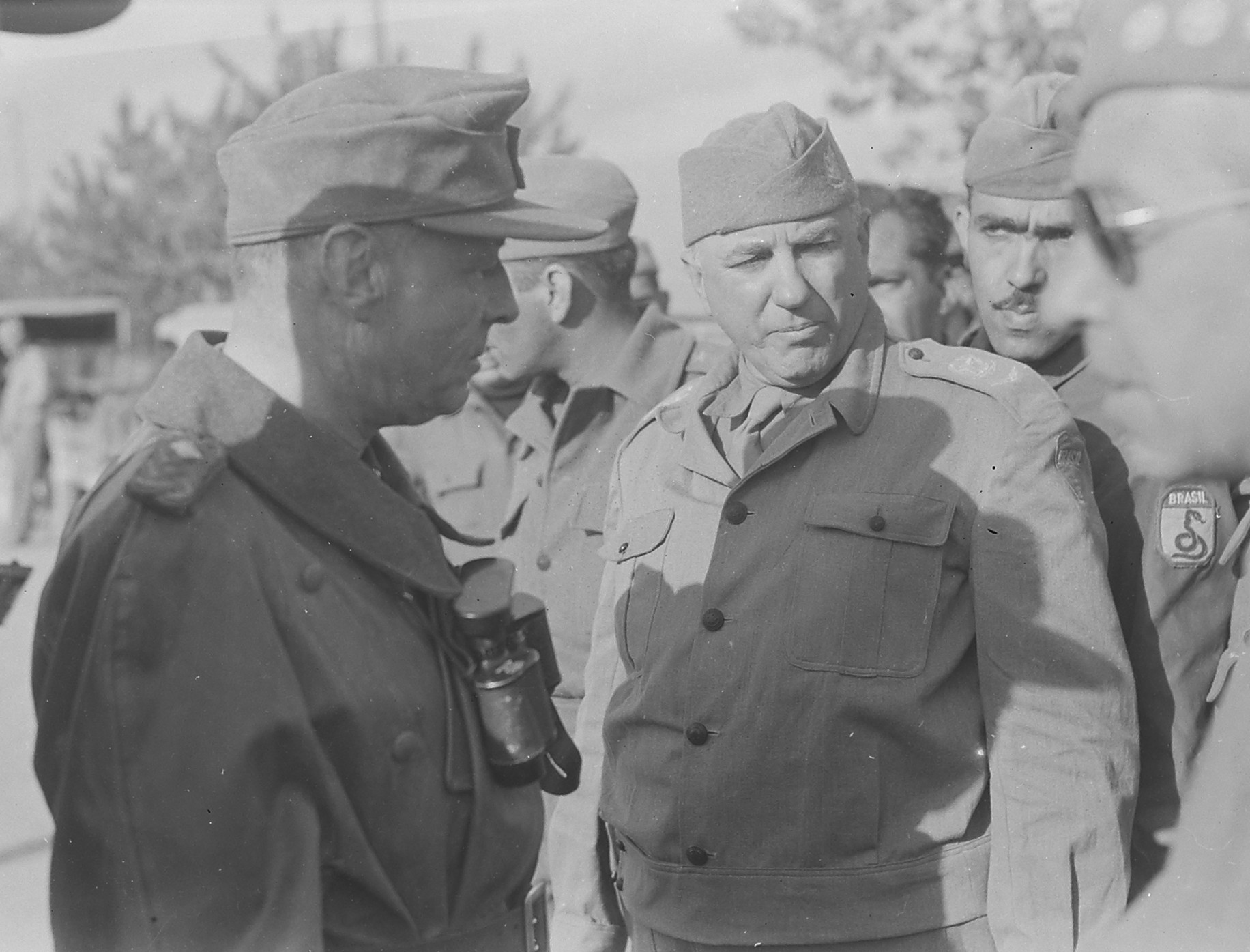
Generalleutnant Otto Fretter-Pico (left) surrendering to General Olímpio Falconière da Cunha (center) surrenders the 148. Infanterie-Division (plus remnants of the 90. Grenadier-Division), ending the Battle of Collecchio, on 29 April 1945.

This took the German Command by surprise as it had planned for these troops to join forces with the German-Italian Army of Liguria to counterattack against the Fifth Army. Fifth Army had advanced, as is inevitable in these situations, in a fast but diffuse and disarranged way uncoordinated with air support, and had left some gaps on its left flank and to the rear. The Axis forces had left many bridges intact along the Po River to facilitate a counter-attack. German Army Command was already negotiating a truce in Caserta, and hoped that a counterattack would improve the conditions for surrender. The events in Fornovo disrupted the German plan, as much by the disarray of their troops as by the delay it caused. This, added to the news of Adolf Hitler's death and the taking of Berlin by the Red Army, left the German Command in Italy with no option but to accept the demand for the unconditional surrender of its troops.

In their final advance, the Brazilians reached Turin and then on 2 May they joined up with French troops at the border in Susa. That same day brought the announcement of the end of hostilities in Italy.

== Air force ==
=== 1st Fighter Squadron ===
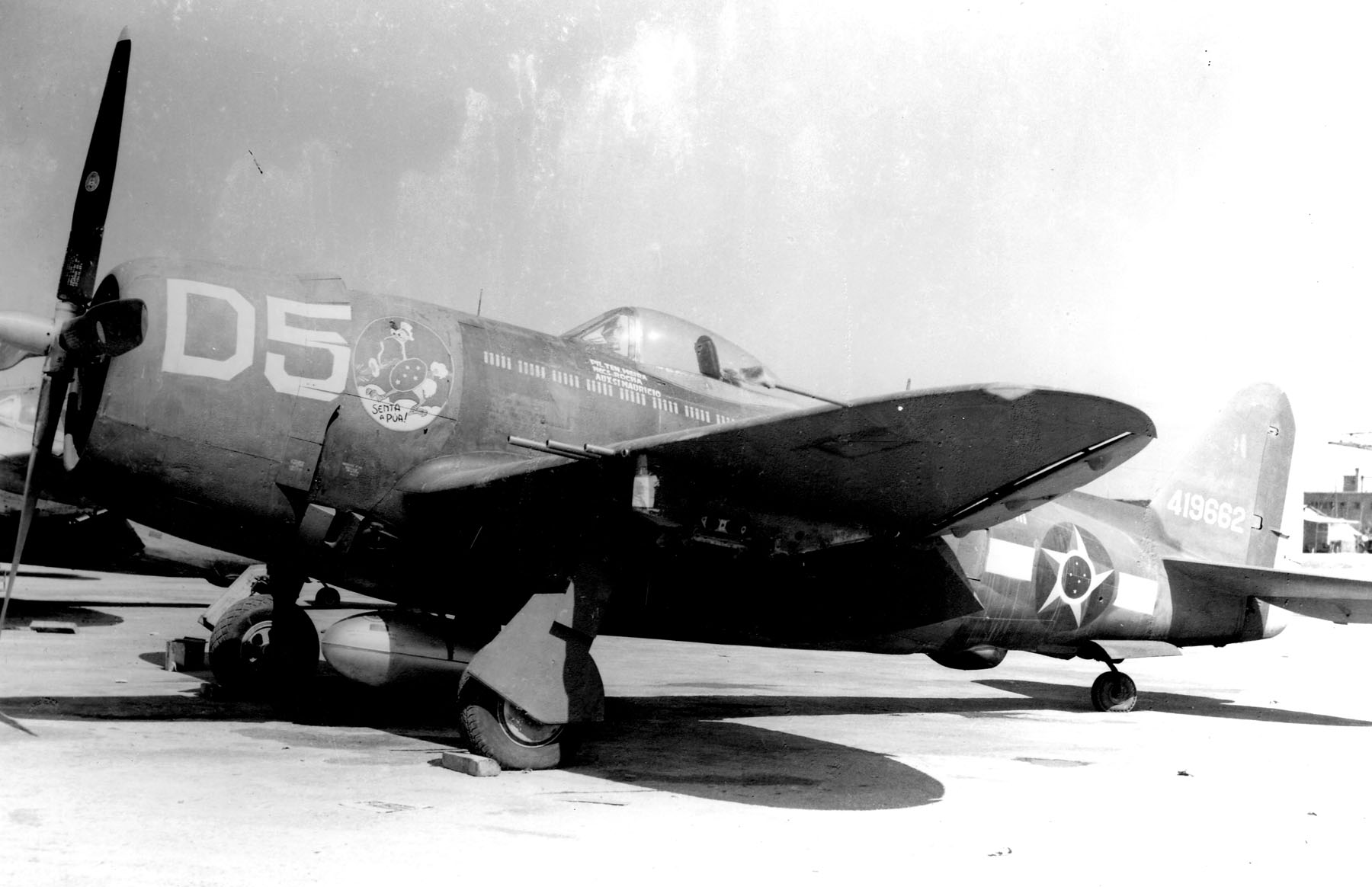
1^{o}GAVCA P-47s carried the "Senta a Pua!" emblem as nose art along with the Brazilian Air Force stars

Arrival of aviators of the Brazilian Air Force who participated in the FEB, 1945.

The 1st Fighter Aviation Group (1^{o}GAVCA, 1st Fighter Squadron/1º Grupo de Aviação de Caça) was formed on December 18, 1943. Its commanding Officer was Ten.-Cel.-Av. (Aviation Lieutenant Colonel) Nero Moura. The Squadron had 350 men, including 48 pilots. It was divided into four flights: Red ("A"), Yellow ("B"), Blue ("C"), and Green ("D"). Unlike the FEB's Army component, the 1^{o}GAVCA had personnel who were experienced Brazilian Air Force (Portuguese: Força Aérea Brasileira, or FAB) pilots. One of them was Alberto M. Torres, who commanded the PBY-5A Catalina that had sunk U-199 (which had been operating off the Brazilian coast).

Among the 48 pilots of the Brazilian Unit who carried out war missions, there was a total of 22 losses; five of the pilots were killed by anti-aircraft fire, eight had their planes shot down and bailed out over enemy territory, six had to give up flying operations on medical orders and three died in flying accidents.

The squadron trained for combat at U.S. bases in Panama, where 2^{o} Ten.-Av. (Aviation Second Lieutenant) Dante Isidoro Gastaldoni was killed in a training accident. On May 11, 1944, the squadron was declared operational and became active in the air defense of the Panama Canal Zone. On June 22, the 1^{o}GAVCA traveled to the US to convert to the Republic P-47D Thunderbolt.

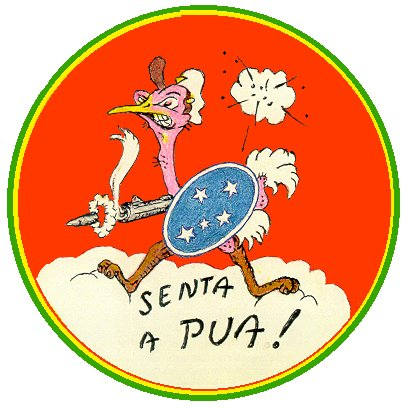
Badge of Brazilian Fighter Squadron

On September 19, 1944 the 1^{o}GAVCA left for Italy, arriving at Livorno on October 6. Since the "Group" arrived at the front with the Minimum Limit Number of pilots for an Air Group, and there was no prediction of replacements arrival in a forthcoming future, it was attached as a Squadron at the 350th Fighter Group of the USAAF, which in turn was part of the 62nd Fighter Wing of the 12th Air Force, into the XXII Tactical Air Command.

The Brazilian pilots initially flew from 31 October 1944, as individual elements of flights attached to 350th FG squadrons, at first in affiliation flights and progressively taking part in more dangerous missions. Less than two weeks later, on November 11, the Brazilian Squadron started its own operations flying from its base at Tarquinia, using its tactical callsign Jambock. Brazilian Air Force stars replaced the white U.S. star in the roundel on the FAB Thunderbolts. The 1^{o}GAVCA started its fighting career as a fighter-bomber unit, its missions being armed reconnaissance and interdiction, in support of the U.S. Fifth Army, to which the FEB was attached. On April 16, 1945, the U.S. Fifth Army started its offensive along the Po Valley. By then, the strength of the "Group" had fallen to the standard size of an air squadron: 23 pilots, since some had been killed, others shot down and captured, while others had been relieved from their duties on medical grounds due to wounds or combat fatigue.

On 22 April 1945, the three remaining flights took off at five-minute intervals, starting at 8:30 AM, to destroy bridges, barges, and motorized vehicles in the San Benedetto region. At 10:00 AM, a flight took off for an armed reconnaissance mission south of Mantua. They destroyed more than 80 German military vehicles, including tanks. By the end of the day, the Brazilian Squadron had flown 44 individual missions and destroyed a high number of vehicles and barges. On this day Brazilians flew the most sorties of the war; consequently, Brazil commemorates April 22 as 'Brazilian Fighter Arm' Day. The 1st Brazilian Fighter Squadron accomplished 445 missions, with a total of 2,546 flights and 5,465 hours of flight on active service. It destroyed 1,304 motor-vehicles, 13 railway wagons, 8 armoured cars, 25 railway and highway bridges and 31 fuel tanks and munition depots.

In all, the 1^{o}GAVCA flew a total of 445 missions, 2,550 individual sorties, and 5,465 combat flight hours, from November 11, 1944 to May 6, 1945. The XXII Tactical Air Command acknowledged the efficiency of the Brazilian Squadron by noting that although it flew only 5% of the total of missions carried out by all squadrons under its control, it accomplished a much higher percentage of the total destruction wrought:

- 85% of the ammunition depots
- 36% of the fuel depots
- 28% of the bridges (19% damaged)
- 15% of motor vehicles (13% damaged)
- 10% of horse-drawn vehicles (10% damaged)

Total of operations of the First Brazilian Fighter Squadron in the Italy Campaign:

Missions accomplished	445
Offensive missions	2,546
Defensive missions	4
Hours of flight in war operations	5,465
Total hours of flight accomplished	6,144
Total Bombs dropped	4,442
Incendiary Bombs (F.T.I)	166
Fragmentation Bombs (260 lbs)	16
Fragmentation Bombs (90 lbs)	72
Demolition Bombs (1.000 lbs)	8
Demolition Bombs (500 lbs)	4,180
Approximate total tonnage of bombs	1,010
Rounds of .50 caliber ammunition fired	1,180,200
Total rockets fired	850
Liters of gasoline consumed	4,058,651

Targets/Objectives	Destroyed	Damaged
Railway engines	01	13
Motorized transport	470	303
Railway and tank cars	63	163
Armored cars	07	11
Animal drawn vehicles	79	19
Railway and highway bridges	04	14
Railway and highway cuttings	55	00
Buildings occupied by the enemy	129	92
Camps occupied by the enemy	18	14
Command posts	02	02
Artillery positions	43	07
Factories	04	03
Miscellaneous buildings	39	04
Fuel depots	06	02
Refineries	01	01
Radar stations	00	02

On April 22, 1986, the 1st Fighter "Group" of the Brazilian Air Force was awarded the United States Presidential Unit Citation for its actions in the Po Valley region of Italy in World War II.

=== 1st Liaison & Observer Flight ===
In contrast to the 1st Fight Squadron, which was an Air Force unit that operated in support of the army, the 1st "Liaison & Observer Flight" (Portuguese acronym: E.L.O.) was directly under the command of the FEB. Formed in late July 1944, the 1st E.L.O. consisted of reservist officers, namely Air Force pilots and Army artillery observers, who flew together aboard Piper L-4H Cubs. This air unit accompanied the Brazilian division throughout its Italian campaign.

== Aftermath ==
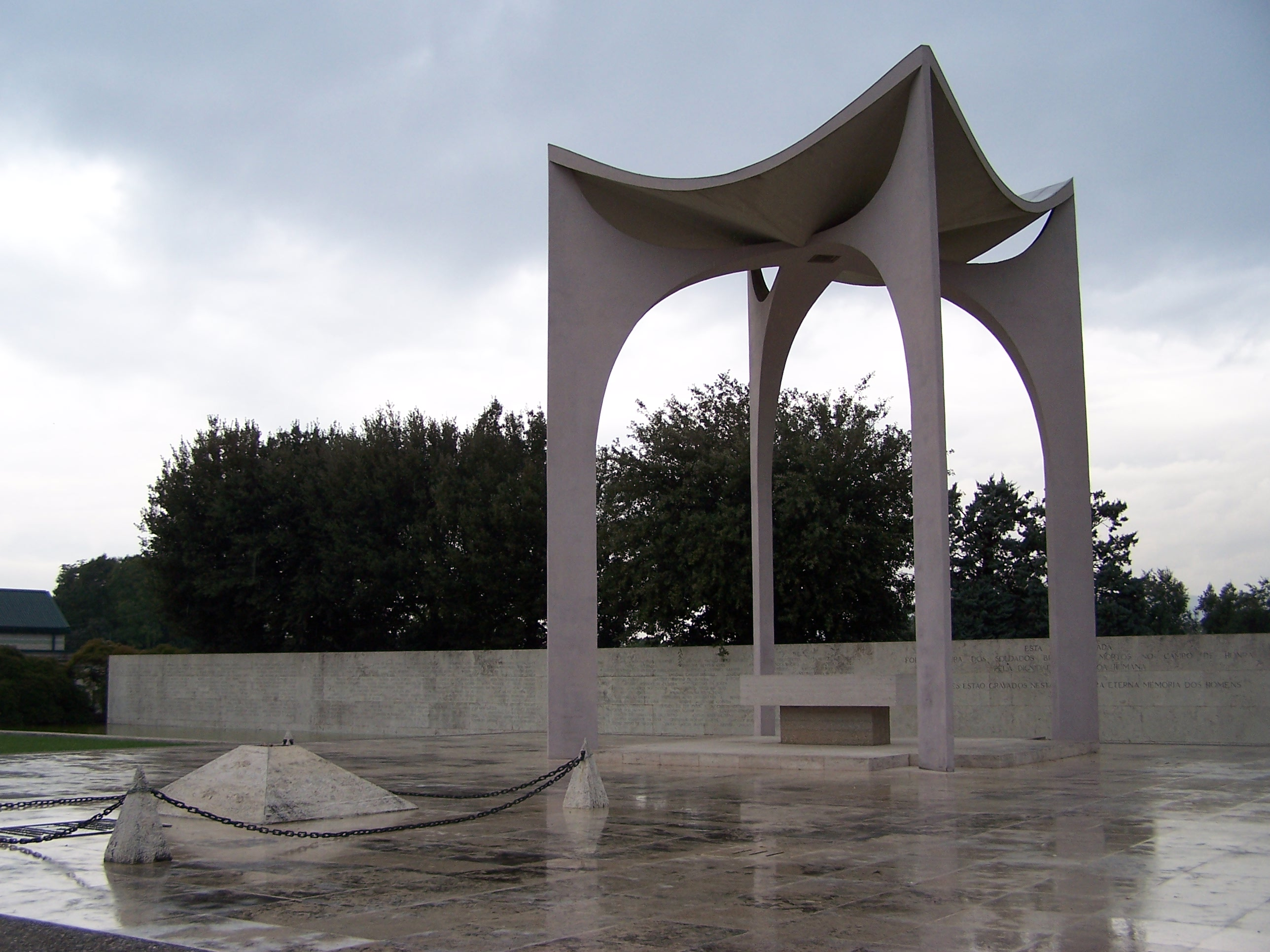
Brazilian Military Cemetery in Pistoia, Italy

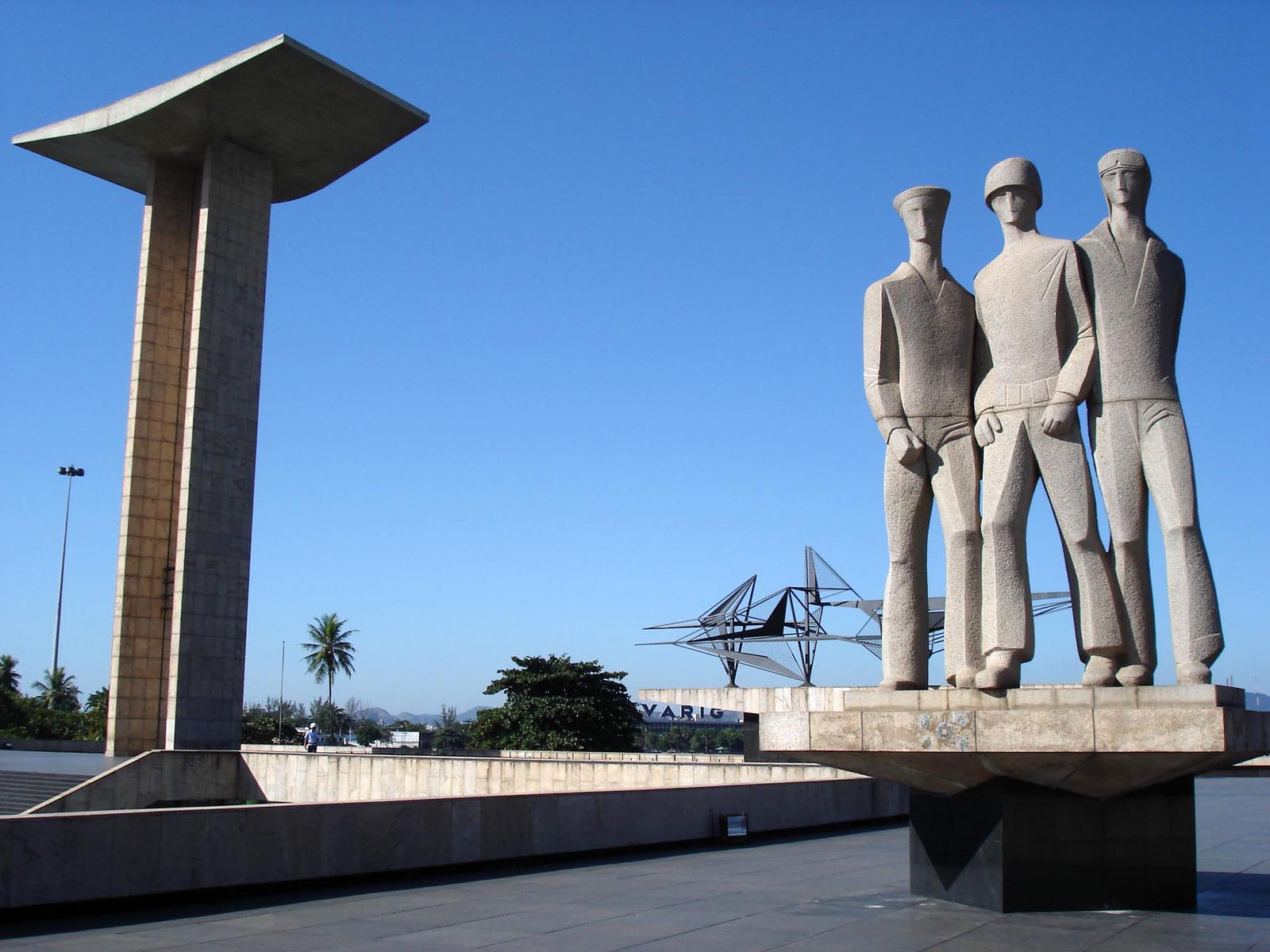
Monument to the dead of World War II in Rio de Janeiro, Brazil

The FEB participated in the post-war occupation of Piacenza, Lodi, and Alessandria. U.S. leaders wished for Brazilian troops to take part in the Allied occupation of Europe, but in early June 1945, Brazil's secretary of war ordered that the unit be subordinate to the commander of the first military region in Rio de Janeiro; it was recalled to Brazil by the end of 1945 and, amid U.S. objections, was dissolved as a distinct military formation. According to historian Frank McCann, Brazil was invited to join the Allied occupation forces in Austria after World War II. However, the Brazilian government was concerned that the FEB might gain political leverage from its contributions to the Allied victory, however modest. Consequently, the government decided to officially demobilize the FEB as soon as the war ended, even while the troops were still stationed in Italy.

Upon their return to Brazil, former members of the FEB faced various restrictions. Non-military veterans, who were discharged upon their return, were prohibited from wearing their decorations or expeditionary uniforms in public. Professional military veterans were reassigned to frontier regions or areas far from major urban centers.

Hundreds of Brazilians who perished in the final offensive were buried in the FEB cemetery in Pistoia. At the urging of Marshal Mascarenhas de Moraes, a new mausoleum was constructed in Rio de Janeiro for all military deaths in the war; in 1960, the cemetery was closed and the remains were officially interred with other Brazilian war dead in the new National Monument to the Dead of World War II. Shortly afterward, a body was found remaining in the former cemetery, and the Brazilian government inaugurated a new Tomb of the Unknown Soldier on the site in 1967.

Brazil's participation in World War II was more extensive than in any foreign conflict outside its region. Its main contribution was to the south Atlantic campaign, which was described by U.S. rear admiral Samuel E. Morison as decisive to Allied victory. However, sending a ground force overseas had more political and social visibility, elevating the country's global stature and evoking national pride. The FEB was one of about 30 Allied military formations (20 divisions and 10 brigades) on the Italian Front at that time. Although it played an important part in the sectors where it operated, Brazil's role was largely tactical, and it never had a major impact on a strategic level. Furthermore, the Italian Front became secondary for both sides after the Normandy landings in June 1944 and the invasion of southern France that August. Nevertheless, the FEB was viewed by contemporaries as a largely effective fighting force, which "completed all the missions confided to it and compared favorably with the American divisions of the Fourth Corps."

== Nickname ==
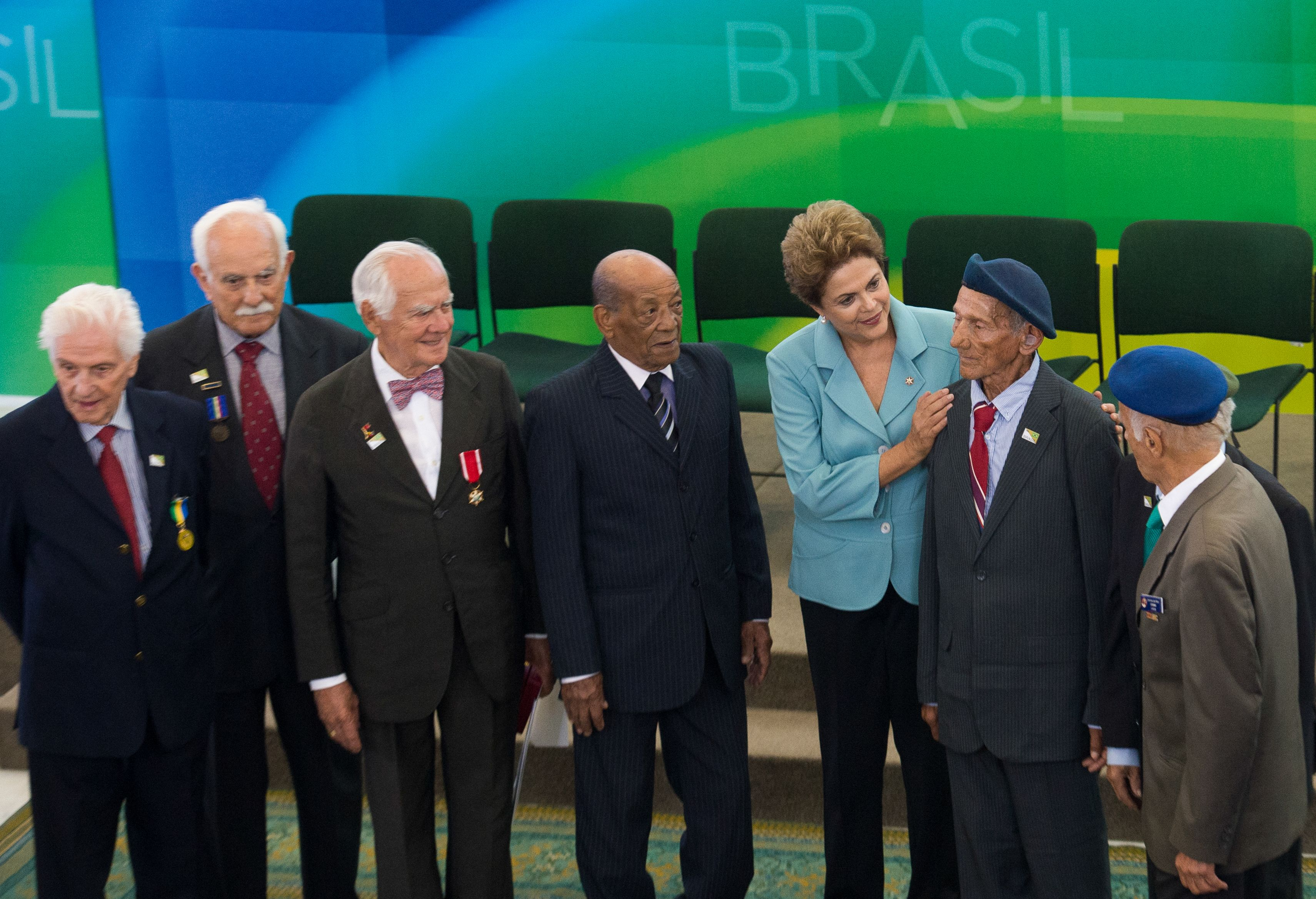
Then-President Dilma Rousseff with veterans of the FEB (known as pracinhas) during a ceremony to commemorate the 70th anniversary of the end of World War II, 8 May 2015.

Due to the Brazilian regime's unwillingness to get more deeply involved in the Allied war effort, by early 1943 a popular saying was: "Mais provável uma cobra fumar um cachimbo, do que a FEB ir para a frente da luta" (literally: "It's more likely for a snake to smoke a pipe than for the FEB to go the front and fight"). (Note: Portuguese: Mais fácil uma cobra fumar um cachimbo, do que a FEB embarcar para o combate.) Before the FEB entered combat, the expression "a cobra vai fumar" ("the snake will smoke") was often used in Brazil in a context similar to "when pigs fly"; soldiers in the division subsequently called themselves Cobras Fumantes (literally, Smoking Snakes) and wore a shoulder patch depicting a green snake smoking a pipe. It was also common for Brazilian soldiers to write on their mortars, "A Cobra Está Fumando..." (literally: "The Snake Is Smoking..."). After the war the meaning was reversed, signifying that something will definitively happen in a furious and worse way. With that second meaning the use of the expression "A Cobra Vai Fumar!" (literally: "The Snake Will Smoke!") has been retained in Brazilian Portuguese until the present.

== See also ==
- Brazil in World War II
- Atlantic naval campaign (World War II)
- Brazil at War – American propaganda film about the Brazilian contribution.
- Battle of Monte Castello
- Battle of Collecchio
- Brazil during World War I
- Elza Medeiros – a Brazilian major, she was the highest-ranking female officer in the FEB.
- Max Wolff – A Brazilian war hero from the FEB.
- Mexican Expeditionary Air Force

== Bibliography ==
- Barone, João. 1942: O Brasil e sua guerra quase desconhecida (1942: Brazil and its almost forgotten war) (in Portuguese), Rio de Janeiro, 2013. ISBN 8520933947
- Baumgardner, Randy W. 10th Mountain Division. Turner Publishing Company, ISBN 978-1-56311-430-4
- Bohmler, Rudolf (1964). Monte Cassino: a German View. Cassell. ASIN B000MMKAYM.
- Brooks, Thomas R. The War North of Rome (June 1944 – May 1945). Da Capo Press, 2003. ISBN 978-0-306-81256-9.
- Buyers, John. História dos 350th fighter group da Força Aérea Americana (in Portuguese). UFAL–Universidade Federal de Alagoas, 2004. ISBN 978-85-7177-322-6.
- Calikevstz, Viviane Regina. "'Categoria especial da sociedade': estudo do patrimônio cultural e da representatividade social da Força Expedicionária Brasileira – FEB" ('Special category of the society': a study of cultural heritage and social representativeness of the Brazilian Expeditionary Force – FEB) (in Portuguese) PhD thesis in Geography - State University of Ponta Grossa, PR, 2017 <http://www.portalfeb.com.br/wp-content/uploads/Tese-Final-pronta-entregue-a-biblioteca.pdf Archived August 30, 2018, at the Wayback Machine>
- Castro, Celso with Vitor Izecksohn and Hendrik Kraay. Nova História Militar Brasileira. Chapters 13 & 14 (in Portuguese). FGV-Fundação Getúlio Vargas, 2004. ISBN 85-225-0496-2.
- Clark, Mark Wayne. Calculated Risk New York: Enigma Books, 1950, republished 2007. ISBN 978-1-929631-59-9.
- Crittenberger, Willis D. The final campaign across Italy; year of edition (in English) 1952. ISBN 857011219X of 1997 reprint (in Portuguese)
- Edwards, Paul M. "Between the Lines of World War II: Twenty-One Remarkable People and Events" McFarland & Co. Inc. Publishers 2010 ISBN 9780786446674. Chapter 9 "The Smoking Cobras".
- Giannasi, Andrea. "Il Brasile in guerra; La partecipazione della Força Expedicionaria Brasileira alla Campagna d'Italia (1944–1945)" (in Italian) Prospettiva editrice (Civitavecchia-Roma) 2004. ISBN 88-7418-284-8
- Heden, Karl E. Sunken Ships, World War II Branden Books, 2006. ISBN 0828321183
- Maximiano, Cesar Campiani. Barbudos, Sujos & Fatigados; Soldados Brasileiros na II Guerra Mundial (Bearded, Dirty & Tired; Brazilian soldiers in World War II) (in Portuguese); Grua Livros, 2010. ISBN 85-61578-13-0.
- Maximiano, Cesar. with Bonalume, Ricardo N. & Bujeiro, Ramiro. Brazilian Expeditionary Force in World War II. Osprey Publishing Ltd., 2011. ISBN 9781849084833 (Print version).
- Moraes, Mascarenhas de., The Brazilian Expeditionary Force, By Its Commander US Government Printing Office, 1966. ASIN B000PIBXCG
- Morais, Fernando. Chatô, o Rei do Brasil ('Chatô, The King of Brazil') (in Portuguese). Cia das Letras, 1994. ISBN 85-7164-396-2.
- Morison, Samuel Eliot "History of United States Naval Operations in World War II: The Battle of the Atlantic; September 1939–May 1943" Little Brown, 1947. ISBN 0252069633
- Lochery, Neill. Brazil: The Fortunes of War, War II and the Making of Modern Brazil Basic Books, 2014 ISBN 9780465039982
- Neto, Ricardo Bonalume. A nossa Segunda Guerra: os brasileiros em combate, 1942–1945 (in Portuguese) Expressão e Cultura, 1995. ISBN 9788520801918
- Ready, J. Lee. Forgotten Allies: The European Theatre, Volume I. McFarland & Company, 1985. ISBN 978-0-89950-129-1.
- Ready, J. Lee. Forgotten Allies: The Military Contribution of the Colonies, Exiled Governments and Lesser Powers to the Allied Victory in World War II. McFarland & Company, 1985. ISBN 978-0-89950-117-8.
- Rohwer, Jürgen. Axis submarine successes of World War Two: German, Italian, and Japanese submarine successes, 1939–1945 Greenhill Books, 1999. ISBN 1853673404
- Several authors; Depoimento de Oficiais da Reserva sobre a F.E.B. ("Testimony of Reserve Officers on Brazilian Expeditionary Division"), (in Portuguese) Editora Cobraci, 1949
- Several, James Lewis. World War II: Battle of the Atlantic Kreactiva Editorial,
- Silva, Hélio. 1942 Guerra no Continente (in Portuguese). Civilização Brasileira, 1972.
- Silva, Hélio. 1944 o Brasil na Guerra (in Portuguese). Civilização Brasileira, 1974.
- The 350th Fighter Group in the Mediterranean Campaign, 2 November 1942 to 2 May 1945 Atglen, Pennsylvania: Schiffer Publishing, 2004. ISBN 0-7643-0220-5.
- Votaw, Homer C. (1950–51), The Brazilian Navy in World War II Published by U.S. Government Printing Office, 1950 on Congressional Record: Proceedings and Debates of US Congress, Volume 96, Part 8. Senate. And by Military Review, Volume XXX, Number X, in 1951.
