= Potenji River Conference =

1943 meeting of Brazil and America presidents

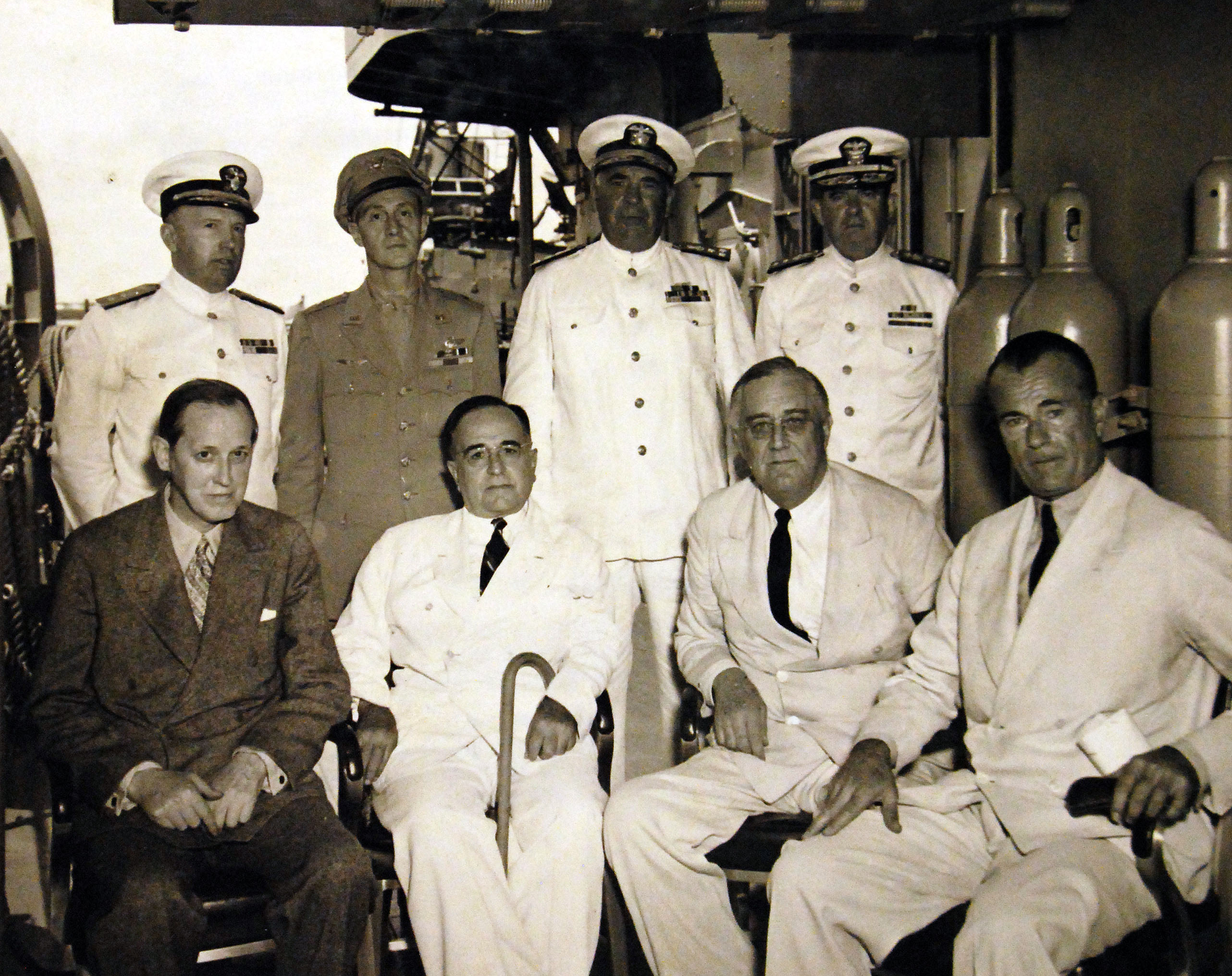
U.S. President Roosevelt and Brazilian President Getúlio Vargas aboard USS Humboldt, during the Potengi River Conference, with Harry Hopkins, Chairman of the British-American Assignment Board (left), and Jefferson Caffery, U.S. Ambassador to Brazil (right).

The Potengi River Conference, also known as the Natal Conference, was a meeting that took place on January 28 and 29, 1943 between the President of Brazil, Getúlio Vargas and the President of the United States, Franklin Delano Roosevelt. On his way back from the Casablanca Conference, the U.S. president paid a visit to the Brazilian president and inspected some of the military installations that were sending aircraft and equipment to the fronts in Africa and Asia. The visit also involved discussions of the ongoing support and role of Brazil in World War II. This conference between the presidents of the two countries took place aboard the USS Humboldt in the Potengi River harbor in Natal, Rio Grande do Norte and defined the agreements that led to the creation of the Brazilian Expeditionary Force.

== See also ==
- Rampa, Natal, an old seaplane base in Natal, the capital city of Rio Grande do Norte, where U.S. President Roosevelt landed in Natal.
- History of Rio Grande do Norte
