= Elza Medeiros =

Female Brazilian Army officer (1921–2009)

Elza Cansanção Medeiros
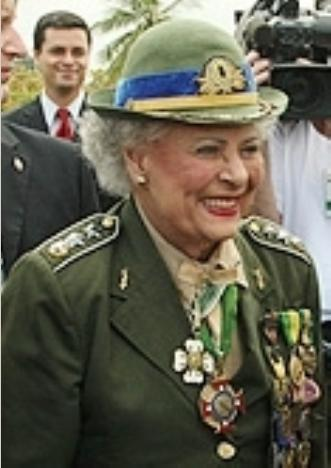
- Born: October 21, 1921; Rio de Janeiro, Federal District, Brazil
- Died: December 8, 2009 (aged 88); Rio de Janeiro, Rio de Janeiro, Brazil
- Military career
- Allegiance: Brazil
- Branch: Brazilian Army
- Service years: 1943–1976
- Rank: Major
- Nickname: Major Elza
- Unit: Brazilian Expeditionary Force (FEB)
- Commands: Health Detachment; 7th Station Hospital
- Conflicts: World War II
- Awards: Campaign Medal; War Medal; Tamandaré Merit Medal; Meritorious Unit Commendation; Free Polish Soldier Medal; Ancien Combatant du Tatre du Operacion du L’Orope Medal; Heroes of Brazil Medal; Santos-Dumont Merit Medal; Order of the Military Merit
- Other work: Author, directress, actress

Elza Cansanção Medeiros, popularly known as Major Elza (October 21, 1921 – December 8, 2009), was a Brazilian Army officer and World War II veteran. She was the highest-ranking female officer in the Brazilian Army with the rank of Major, having deployed to Italy during the war along with the Brazilian Expeditionary Force as a nurse. Medeiros used to lecture about the Brazilian participation in World War II.

== Biography ==
Medeiros was born in Rio de Janeiro on October 21, 1921, the daughter of sanitary doctor Tadeu de Araújo Medeiros—a friend of Alberto Santos Dumont and direct assistant of Oswaldo Cruz in the campaign against yellow fever. At the age of nineteen, she was the first Brazilian to volunteer in the Army Health Directorate to serve in World War II. Although she dreamed of fighting on the front line, she had to settle for being one of the seventy-three nurses in the Precursor Health Detachment of the Brazilian Expeditionary Force, since the Brazilian Army at the time did not accept female combatants.

With her parents, from Alagoas, she learned to shoot, still in her teens. With the German housekeepers who served their family in the 1930s Copacabana, she learned Music and languages. By appointment of Arnon de Melo, father of President Fernando Collor de Mello, she joined the Brazilian Press Association. It premiered, with Fernando Torres, Nathalia Timberg and Sérgio Britto at the University Theater, with the play Dama da Madrugada. She graduated from the School of Nursing at the Red Cross. She graduated in Journalism from the National Faculty of Philosophy.

Her service in World War II began in Alagoas, providing relief to the shipwrecked Itapagé, torpedoed on the Brazilian coast by the German submarine U-161 commanded by Captain Albrecht Achilles.

During the conflict, she worked in evacuation hospitals in Italy, far from the front, in twelve-hour shifts, no soldier having died in her arms. She served as Liaison Officer and Chief Nurse at the 7th Station Hospital in Livorno. With the end of the conflict, she was dismissed shortly after returning to the country, and became an employee for Banco do Brasil.

In 1957, the women were reconvened and could join the military; Medeiros promptly returned to her nurse duties. Despite working for the National Intelligence Service of Brazil (SNI), she never considered abandoning her military career.

She graduated in journalism, history of the Americas, psychology, parapsychology, tourism and human relations. With knowledge of mechanics, sculpture, painting and tapestry, Medeiros traveled the world twice, having been to the Antarctic continent. She learned to fly ultralight aircraft at the age of sixty.

"Major Elza" founded and directed two magazines and signed several columns in newspapers from Rio de Janeiro and Recife, having written three books on her participation in World War II. She also presented numerous papers at military medicine congresses, with special emphasis on suggestions for the creation of a Women's Auxiliary Corps for the Armed Forces, the basis for opening the Brazilian Armed Forces to women's participation.

A member of the Alagoas Academy of Culture, she also worked towards the preservation of FEB's photographic memory.

Elza Cansanção Medeiros died on December 8, 2009, in her hometown of Rio de Janeiro.

== See also ==
- Brazilian Expeditionary Force
