= Battle of Montese =

Battle of the Italian campaign of World War II

- Part of the Italian campaign of World War II
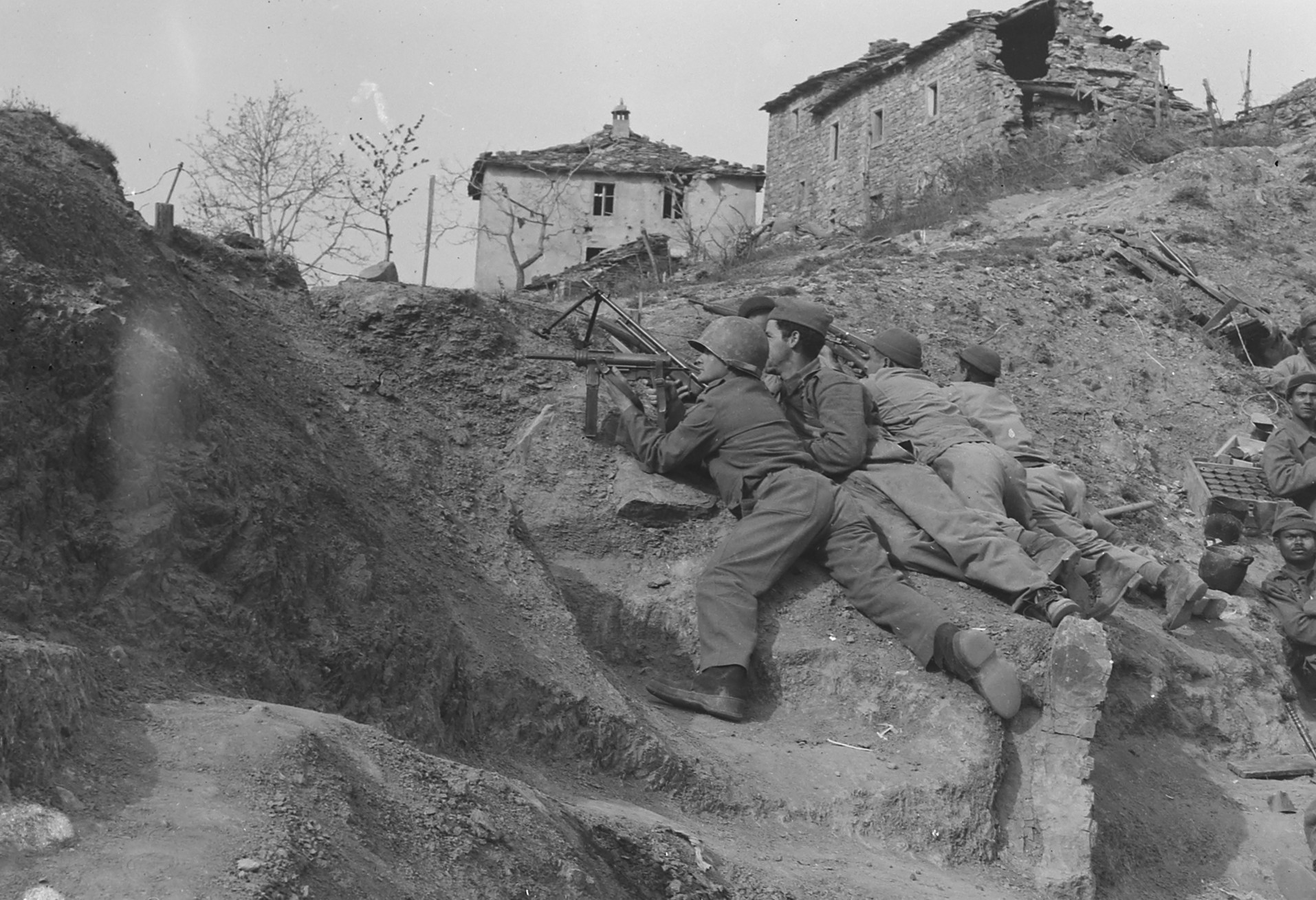
- Brazilian soldiers at the Battle of Montese
Date	14–17 April 1945
Location	Montese, Italy
Result	Allied victory

Belligerents
Brazil; United States	Germany

Commanders and leaders
Mascarenhas de Morais	Martin Strahammer

Units involved
Brazilian Expeditionary Force; 10th Mountain Division	Wehrmacht

Casualties and losses
~426 casualties	497 casualties
- 189 civilians killed

The Battle of Montese was fought from 14 to 17 April 1945 in the Italian commune of Montese, at the end of World War II, as part of the final Allied offensive in the Italian campaign. It pitted the 1st Division of the Brazilian Expeditionary Force (FEB), reinforced by tanks from the American 1st Armored Division, against German troops of the Wehrmacht's 14th Army. It is considered the bloodiest World War II battle fought by Brazil.

== Background ==
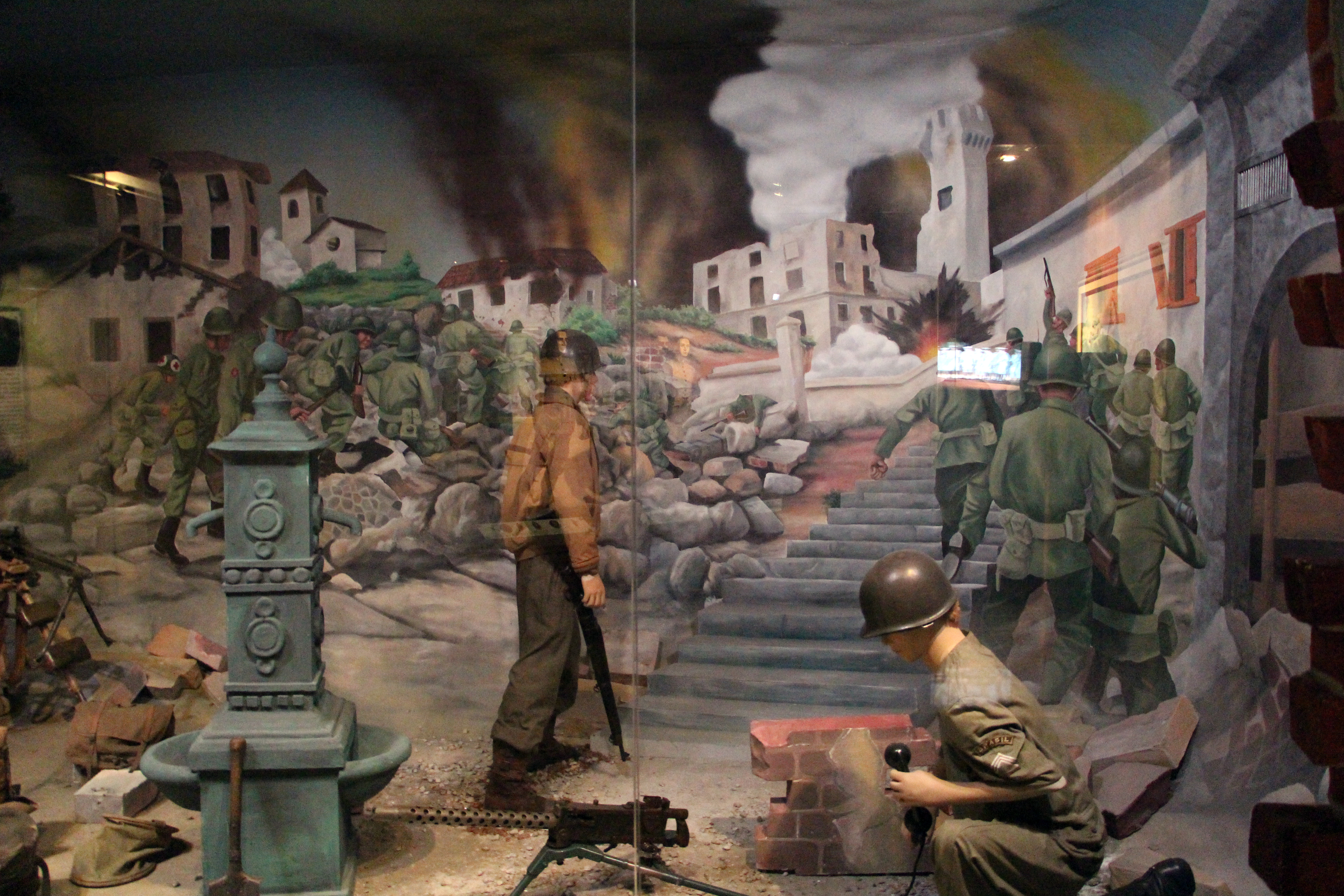
A diorama mockup of the battle on display at the Fort Copacabana museum in Rio de Janeiro, Brazil.

The commune of Montese occupies a vast area of hills bordering the provinces of Modena and Bologna, in the Emilia-Romagna region. It was considered a region of difficult access due to the German fortifications built as part of the Gothic Line. German troops were in possession of the Montese area. Contrary to the expectations of the Allied Command in Italy, the final spring offensive, which had begun a week earlier in the British 8th Army sector, had made little progress, encountering strong resistance from the main German forces in Italy. Thus, the offensive in the American 5th Army sector (to which the 1st Brazilian Division was attached) began on 14 April without benefiting from the advances that were still expected in the British sector.

In the American sector, the 1st Brazilian Division would become the only Allied division to attain the planned objective on the first day of the offensive. In Montese, which was the division's objective, the action involved, in addition to infantry, artillery garrisons and supporting armored units. The 3rd Battalion of the 11th Infantry Regiment, which would advance towards Serreto-Paravento-Montelo, was at the center of the Brazilian formation, with the 1st Battalion on the left and the 2nd Battalion on the right.

== Battle ==
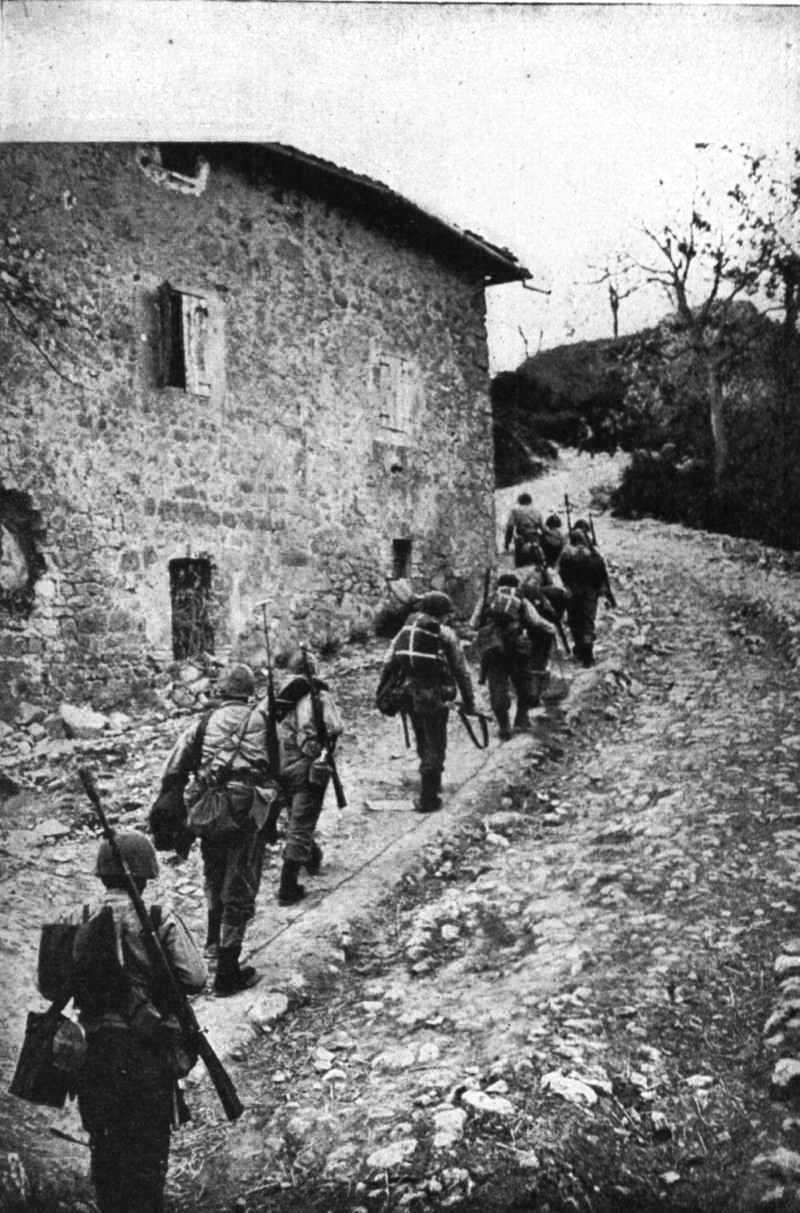
Brazilian infantrymen crossing the village of Sassomolare

At 1:30 p.m. on April 14, the Brazilians attacked Montese, making their debut in modern urban warfare. The advance of the soldiers of the 11th Infantry Regiment was observed by the Brazilian commanders in Sassomolare (a frazione of Castel d'Aiano), which provided a perfect view of Montese. At the scheduled time, the 1st Platoon attacked the summit; after covering one third of the route, it fell under intense artillery fire, which severed the telephone lines in several places, making contact between the teams difficult. In addition, some soldiers were struck.

Once these setbacks had been overcome, the platoon reached the top of the Montese heights; however, it had lost contact with the company due to the telephone lines being cut. The radio, due to the distance and the uneven terrain, had also stopped working. Allied field artillery then bombarded the summit, aiming to dislodge the Germans who held out in casemates and trenches. Afterwards, the platoons attacked, aiming to consolidate the position, killing or capturing all remaining German soldiers.

The 2nd Combat Group, shortly after joining the 1st Group, was ordered to subdue enemy forces that were harassing the right flank. Placed in a favorable position, and firing from a short distance on a shelter where an enemy machine gun had been located, it captured the enemy position after a few attacks. By nightfall on April 14, the positions on the hillside of Montese had been consolidated. At that point, German casualties consisted of a few killed and eight captured, while the Brazilian division had suffered one dead and three wounded.

On the morning of 15 April, with German artillery still pounding the town, Brazilian troops proceeded with the clearing of Montese. German forces then began an attempt to retake the town, in what remains, to this day, the Brazilian Army's bloodiest battle on foreign soil since the Paraguayan War. The Germans made the mistake of considering the attack by the Brazilian division on Montese (which, in addition to the support of American armored cars, deployed its own M10 tank destroyers, M8 Greyhounds and M4 Shermans) as the main Allied objective in that sector, firing about 1,800 artillery rounds against the Brazilian division, out of a total of 2,800 rounds used against all four Allied divisions in that sector of the Italian front.

With the end of German counterattacks on 16 April, the battle was considered finished. With reinforcements from the 6th Infantry Regiment, mopping-up operations against snipers continued until the 17th in Montese and the surrounding area.

== Aftermath ==
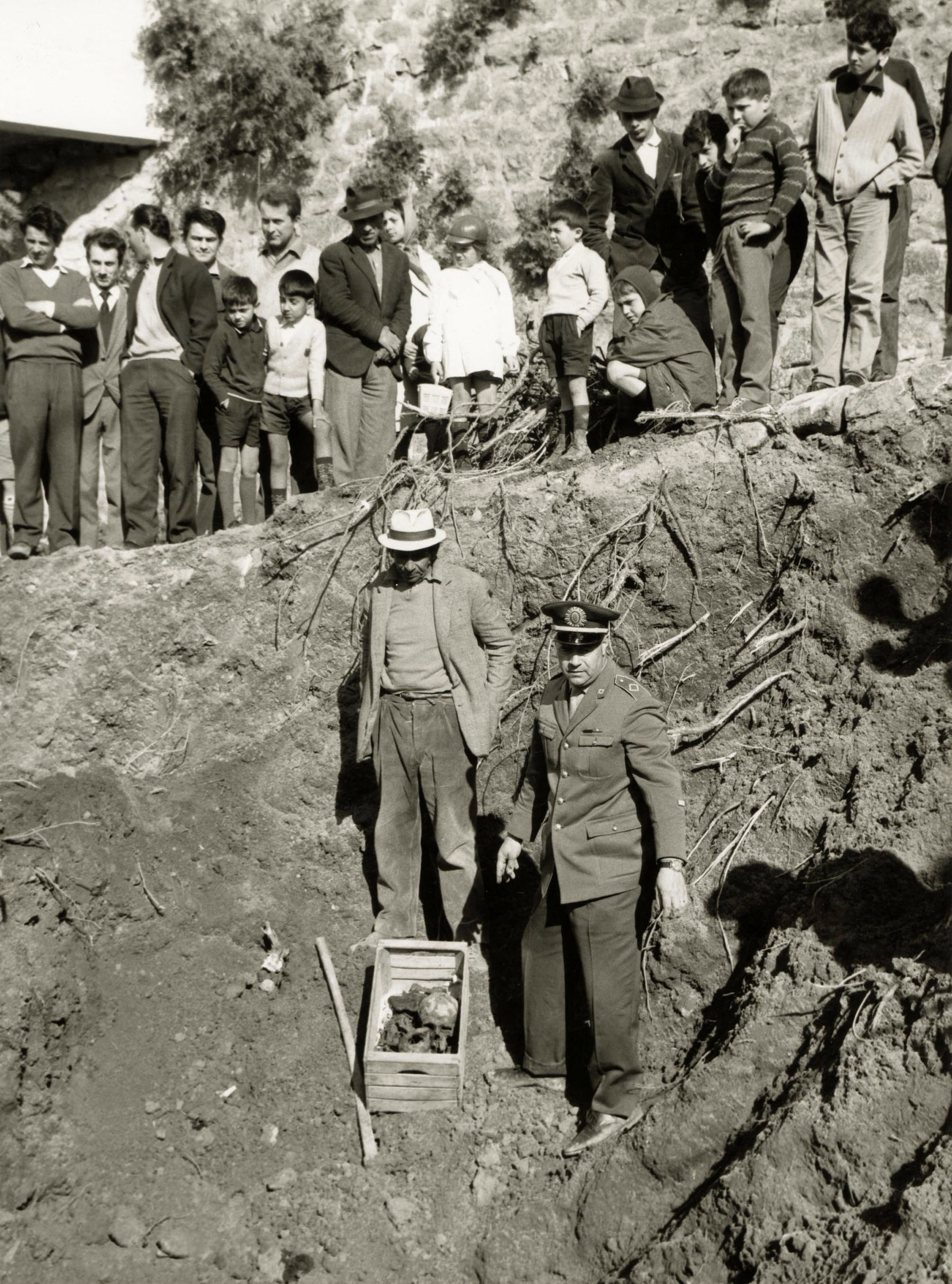
Post-war excavation of the remains of the last missing Brazilian soldier in Montese, 1969

After three days of fighting, Montese had suffered extensive damage: of the 1,121 houses in the town, no less than 833 had been destroyed. The battle also claimed the lives of 189 civilians. The Brazilian division carried out its mission at a high cost: around 430 casualties, including dead, wounded, captured or missing. On the German side, the estimate made at the time, and confirmed in later excavations, was 497 casualties, including 453 dead and wounded.

The conquest of Montese significantly marked the beginning of the Spring 1945 offensive in Italy, codenamed Operation Grapeshot. Added to the victories scored by the Allies in other locations, this victory contributed to the complete dismantling of the German defense lines in the sector of the United States Fifth Army, and consequently in the rest of Italy.

The commune of Montese, in recognition of the role of the Brazilian troops in its liberation, honored them by naming one of its squares Piazza Brasile ("Brazil Square"). The anthem of the Brazilian Expeditionary Force, Canção do Expedicionário, is taught in schools and sung by the children of the region to this day.

== Sources ==
- Barone, João (2013). 1942: O Brasil e sua guerra quase desconhecida. Nova Fronteira. ISBN 9788520935200.
- Böhmler, Rudolf (1966). Monte Cassino. Flamboyant. ASIN B000MMKAYM.
- Brayner, Floriano de Lima (1968). A verdade sôbre a FEB: Memórias de um chefe de Estado-Maior na Campanha da Itália, 1943-1945. Civilização Brasileira.
- Castro, Celso; Izecksohn, Vitor; Kraay, Hendrik (2004). Nova História Militar Brasileira. Fundação Getúlio Vargas. ISBN 85-225-0496-2.
- Crittenberger, Willis D (1997). Campanha final ao noroeste da Itália. BibliEx. ISBN 857011219X.
- Donato, Hernâni (1996). Dicionário das Batalhas Brasileiras. IBRASA. ISBN 8534800340.
- Mascarenhas de Morais, João Batista (1984). Memórias. BibliEx. ISBN 8570110790.
- Neto, Ricardo Bonalume (1995). A nossa Segunda Guerra: os brasileiros em combate, 1942-1945. Expressão e Cultura. ISBN 8520801919.
- Oliveira, Dennison de (2008). Os Soldados Alemães de Vargas. Juruá. ISBN 9788536220765.
- Souza, Simonal Silva de (2005). Batalha de Montese. Primyl. ISBN 8590526011.
