= Brazil at War =

1943 film

- Produced by: Office of War Information, Office of the Coordinator of Inter-American Affairs
- Release date: 1943
- Running time: 9 min
- Country: United States
- Language: English

Brazil at War is a 1943 propaganda short documentary film produced by the Office of War Information and the Office of the Coordinator of Inter-American Affairs.

The 9-minute-long film starts by showing Brazil's comparisons with the United States, such as its geographic size, population, and military history during World War I. It trumpets Brazil's supposed "progressiveness" under Getúlio Vargas, noting that Rio de Janeiro is a "modern city" known for its arts and culture, and that Brazil's constitution allows freedom for its workers and social services. Then shots of the Brazilian Army and Navy are shown, and we are told that 3 million conscripts are planned. (A Brazilian Expeditionary Force did later see action in the Italian Campaign.)

After the segment on Brazil's military, the economic contributions of Brazil are delved into, especially its rubber and crystal production.
