= USS Humboldt =

Tender of the United States Navy

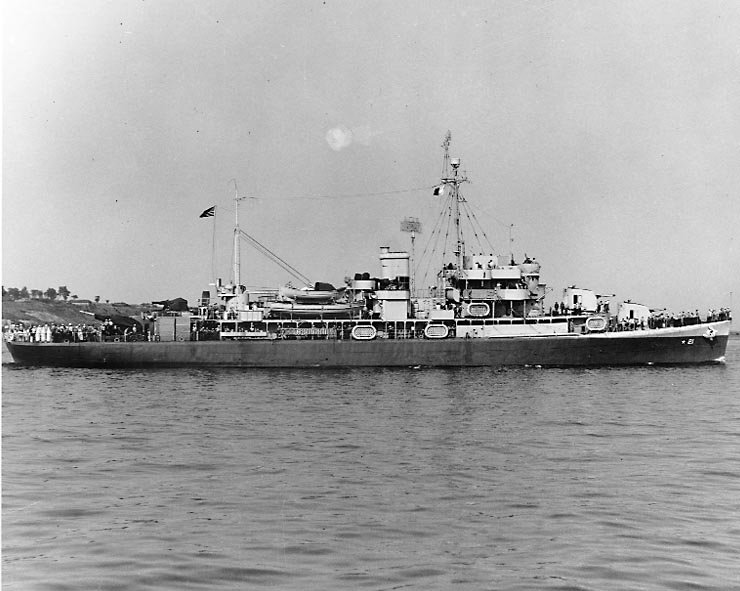
- USS Humboldt (AVP-21) on 23 August 1943 after modification at the Boston Navy Yard, during which she received a third 5-inch (127 mm) 38-caliber dual-purpose gun mount and one quadruple and two twin 40-mm antiaircraft gun mounts.

History

United States
- Name: USS Humboldt (AVP-21)
- Namesake: Humboldt Bay, on the northern coast of California
- Builder: Boston Navy Yard, Boston, Massachusetts
- Laid down: 6 September 1940
- Launched: 17 March 1941
- Sponsored by: Mrs. William T. Tarrant
- Commissioned: 7 October 1941
- Reclassified: Miscellaneous auxiliary (as press information ship), AG-121, 30 July 1945; Returned to seaplane tender designation, AVP-21, in 1945 after conversion to AG-121 cancelled
- Decommissioned: 17 March 1947
- Stricken: 1970
- Fate: Loaned to U.S. Coast Guard, 24 January 1949; Transferred outright to Coast Guard 26 September 1966
- Acquired: Transferred from U.S. Coast Guard 30 September 1969
- Stricken: 1970
- Fate: Sold for scrapping 1970

United States
- Name: USCGC Humboldt (WAVP-372)
- Namesake: Previous name retained
- Acquired: Loaned by United States Navy to Coast Guard 24 January 1949; Transferred permanently from Navy to Coast Guard 26 September 1966
- Commissioned: 29 March 1949
- Reclassified: High endurance cutter, WHEC-372, 1 May 1966
- Decommissioned: 30 September 1969
- Fate: Transferred to U.S. Navy 30 September 1969

General characteristics (seaplane tender)
- Type: Barnegat-class small seaplane tender
- Displacement: 1,766 tons (light); 2,750 tons (full load)
- Length: 311 ft 8 in (95.00 m)
- Beam: 41 ft 1 in (12.52 m)
- Draft: 13 ft 6 in (4.11 m)
- Installed power: 6,000 horsepower (4.48 megawatts)
- Propulsion: Diesel engines, two shafts
- Speed: 18.6 knots (34.4 km/h)
- Complement: 215 (ship's company); 367 (including aviation unit)
- Sensors & processing systems: Radar; sonar
- Armament: 2 × single 5 in (130 mm) 38-caliber dual-purpose gun mount; 4 × dual 20 mm antiaircraft gun mounts; 2 × depth charge tracks
- Aviation facilities: Supplies, spare parts, repairs, and berthing for one seaplane squadron; 80,000 US gallons (300,000 L) aviation fuel

General characteristics (Coast Guard cutter)
- Class & type: Casco-class cutter
- Displacement: 2,498 tons (full load) in 1966
- Length: 311 ft 7.75 in (94.9897 m) overall; 300 ft 0 in (91.44 m) between perpendiculars
- Beam: 41 ft 0 in (12.50 m) maximum
- Draft: 12 ft 9 in (3.89 m) maximum
- Installed power: 6,250 bhp (4,660 kW) in 1966
- Propulsion: Fairbanks-Morse direct-reversing diesel engines, two shafts; 166,430 US gallons (630,000 L) of fuel
- Speed: 17.3 knots (32.0 km/h) (maximum sustained in 1966); 10.0 knots (18.5 km/h) (economic)
- Range: 10,138 nautical miles (18,776 km) at 17.3 knots (32.0 km/h) in 1966; 20,500 nautical miles (38,000 km) at 11.0 knots (20.4 km/h) in 1966
- Complement: 151 (10 officers, 3 warrant officers, 138 enlisted personnel)
- Sensors & processing systems: Radars in 1966: SPS-23, SPS-29B; Sonar in 1966: SQS-1
- Armament: In 1966: one single 5-inch (127 mm) 38-caliber Mark 12 gun mount, 1 x Mark 52 director, 1 x Mark 26 fire-control radar, 1 x Mark 10 Mod 0 antisubmarine projector, 2 x Mark 32 Mod 2 torpedo tubes

USS Humboldt (AVP-21) was a United States Navy Barnegat-class small seaplane tender in commission from 1941 to 1947 that served in the Atlantic during World War II. She was briefly reclassified as a miscellaneous auxiliary and redesignated AG-121 during 1945. After the war, she was in commission in the United States Coast Guard as the cutter USCGC Humboldt (WAVP-372), later WHEC-372, from 1949 to 1969.

== Construction and commissioning ==
Humboldt (AVP-21) was laid down at the Boston Navy Yard, Massachusetts, on 6 September 1940. She was launched on 17 March 1941, sponsored by Mrs. William T. Tarrant, and commissioned on 7 October 1941.

== United States Navy service ==
=== South Atlantic operations ===
Following rigorous shakedown training off the United States East Coast, Humboldt sailed from Norfolk, Virginia, on 13 May 1942 to join Rear Admiral Jonas H. Ingram's South Atlantic Force on the coast of Brazil. After stops at San Juan, Puerto Rico, and Trinidad, she arrived at Recife, Brazil, on 5 August 1942 and began tending the seaplanes of Patrol Squadron 83 (VP-83).

During the months that followed, these patrol aircraft, operating with ships of the Brazilian Navy and U.S. Navy, patrolled the South Atlantic Ocean sea lanes and hunted Axis submarines. Humboldt supplied and repaired seaplanes and, in addition, carried aviation gasoline to outlying air bases along the Brazilian coast while engaging in antisubmarine patrols herself.

While at Natal, Brazil, on 28 January 1943, Humboldt was the site of the Potenji River Conference, between President Franklin D. Roosevelt, who was returning from the Casablanca Conference, and President Getúlio Vargas of Brazil. This meeting helped to achieve even closer cooperation between the naval units of the two countries and involved discussions of the ongoing support and role of Brazil in World War II.

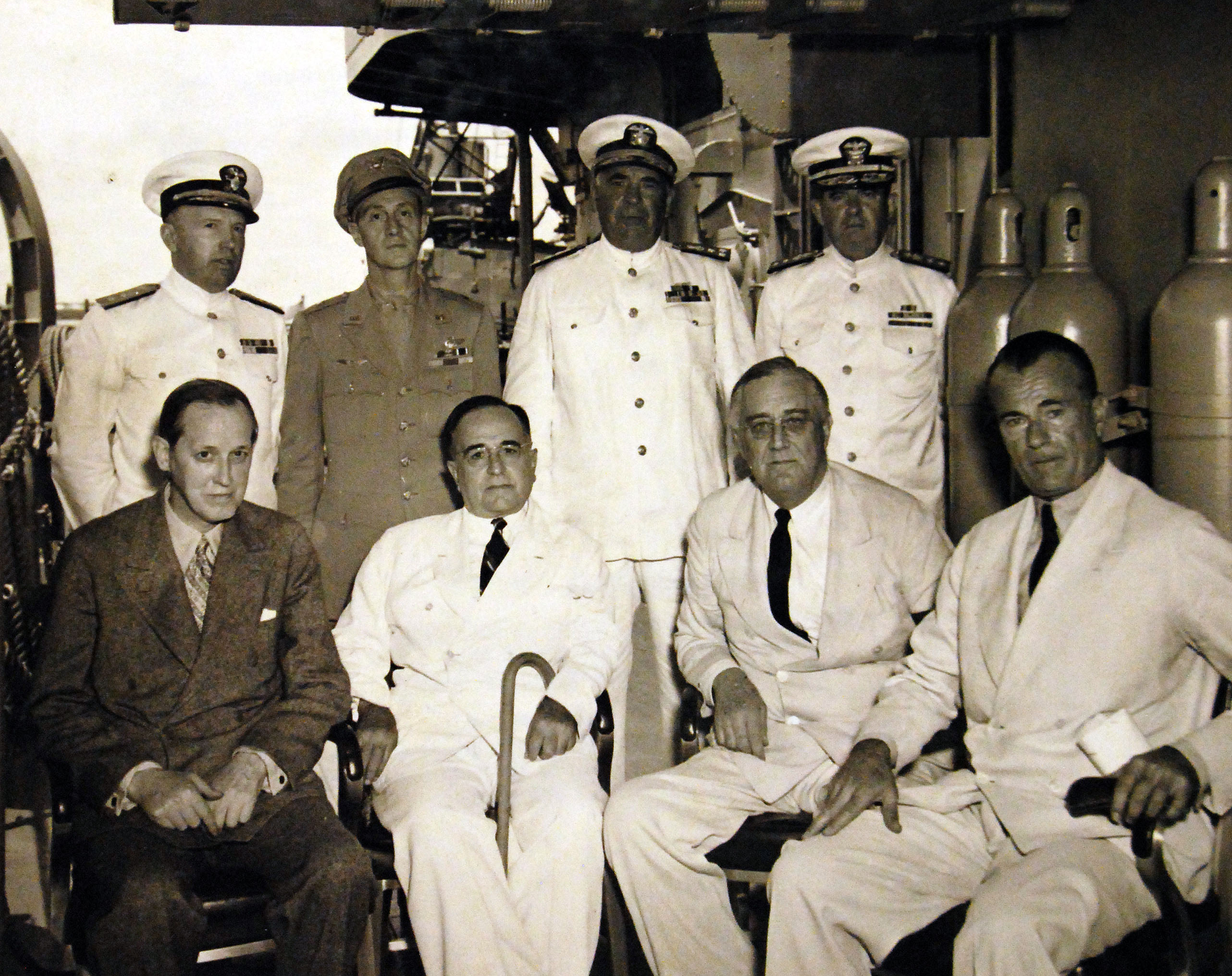
U.S. President Roosevelt and Brazilian President Getúlio Vargas aboard USS Humboldt, during the Potenji River Conference, with Harry Hopkins, Chairman of the British-American Assignment Board (left), and Jefferson Caffery, U.S. Ambassador to Brazil (right).

After the meeting of the two presidents, Humboldt continued to visit isolated ports on the Brazilian coast with supplies and established a new seaplane base at Aratú Port, in the city of Candeias, Bahia, Brazil, in May 1943.

=== North Atlantic operations ===
Humboldt headed north on 1 July 1943, arriving at Boston, Massachusetts, on 17 July 1943 to take up new duties in the North Atlantic Ocean. Departing on 23 August 1943, she carried supplies and parts to U.S. Navy fleet air wings in Newfoundland, Iceland, and the United Kingdom. She continued this dangerous duty, often sailing unescorted, into the early months of 1944, occasionally sailing to Casablanca in French Morocco as well.

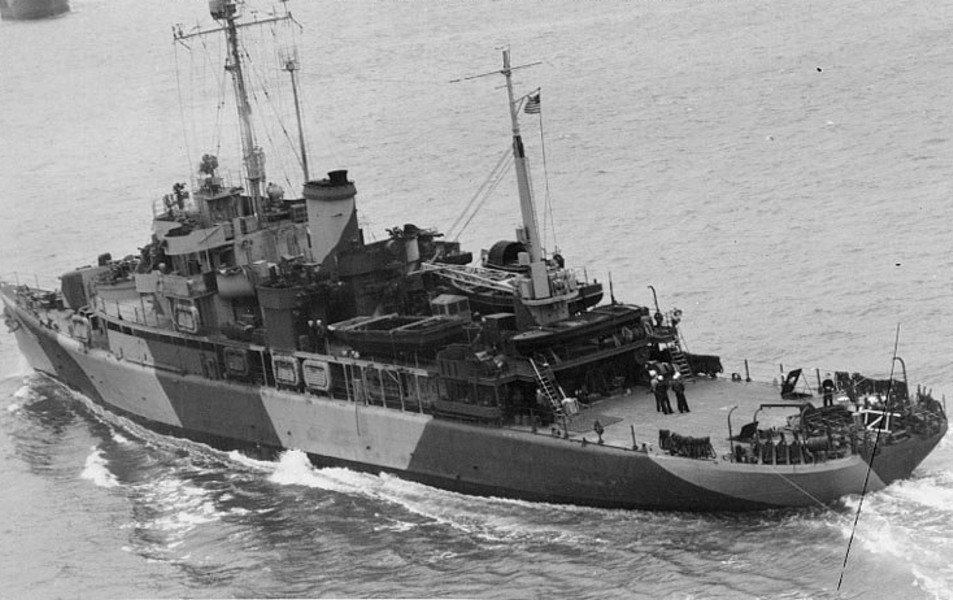
USS Humboldt (AVP-21) off Norfolk, Virginia, on 17 November 1944.

Humboldt was at Casablanca in late May 1944 when she heard that a German submarine had torpedoed the escort aircraft carrier USS Block Island and the destroyer escort USS Barr in the Atlantic, sinking Block Island and damaging Barr. Humboldt steamed out to help with survivors and to escort Barr to safety.

Humboldt was soon underway again, this time to bring an experienced U.S. Navy submarine officer to rendezvous with the escort aircraft carrier USS Guadalcanal hunter-killer group, which had just captured the U-505 in an epic encounter on 4 June 1944.

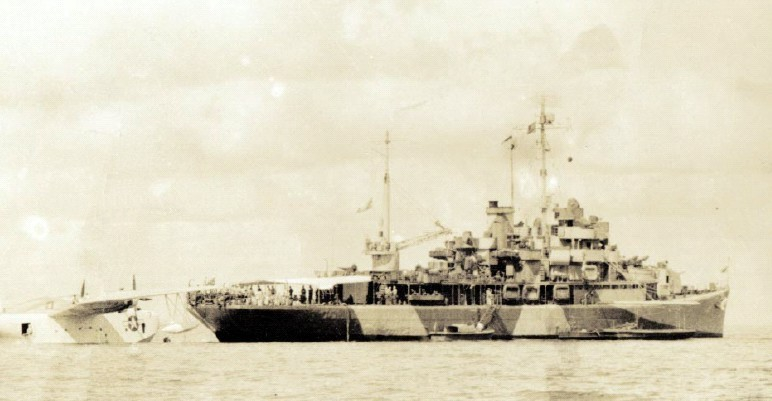
USS Humboldt with a PBM Mariner flying boat of VPB-203 at Bahia, Brazil, in April 1945.

Humboldt continued to bring supplies to aviation squadrons in the Azores and North Africa until 22 March 1945.

=== Return to South Atlantic service ===
On 22 March 1945, Humboldt departed Norfolk, Virginia, for Brazil. Returning to her original seaplane tending duties in the South Atlantic, Humboldt arrived at Recife, Brazil, on 5 April 1945 and remained on duty until the surrender of Germany in early May 1945, after which she departed Brazil for Norfolk on 10 June 1945.

=== Conversion to press information ship ===
Humboldt moved to the Philadelphia Navy Yard in Philadelphia, Pennsylvania, on 16 July 1945, for conversion to a press information ship. Reclassified as a miscellaneous auxiliary and redesignated AG-121 on 30 July 1945, Humboldt was to serve as a broadcast and teletype center for correspondents during the planned invasion of Japan in 1945–1946. However, hostilities with Japan ended on 15 August 1945, making the invasion unnecessary before her conversion was completed.

=== Post-World War II and decommissioning ===
Humboldt was converted back into a seaplane tender and was again designated AVP-21. She arrived at Orange, Texas, on 22 November 1945, for inactivation. She was decommissioned on 19 March 1947 and laid up in the Atlantic Reserve Fleet at Orange.

== United States Coast Guard service ==
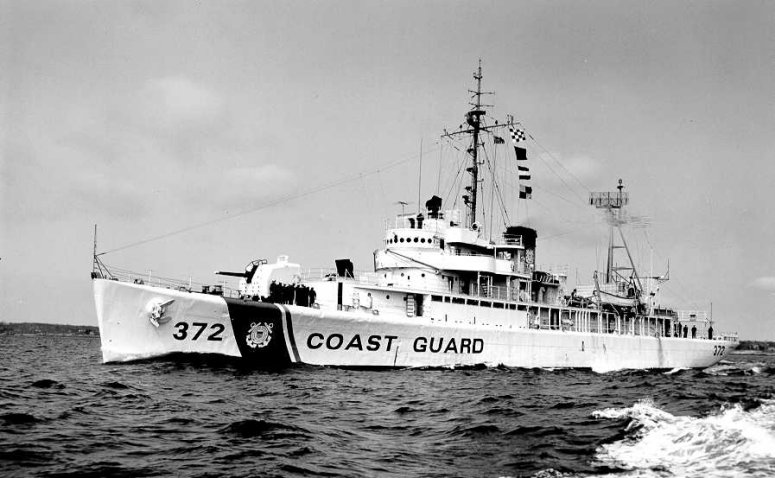
USCGC Humboldt (WHEC-372) sometime after the U.S. Coast Guard's 1967 adoption of the "racing stripe" markings on its ships.

Barnegat-class ships were very reliable and seaworthy and had good habitability, and the Coast Guard viewed them as ideal for ocean station duty, in which they would perform weather reporting and search and rescue tasks, once they were modified by having a balloon shelter added aft and having oceanographic equipment, an oceanographic winch, and a hydrographic winch installed. After World War II, the U.S. Navy transferred 18 of the ships to the Coast Guard, in which they were known as the Casco-class cutters.

Humboldt was loaned to the Coast Guard at 24 January 1949. After undergoing conversion for use as a weather-reporting ship, she was commissioned into Coast Guard service as USCGC Humboldt (WAVP-372) on 29 March 1949.

=== Service history ===
During her Coast Guard career, Humboldt's primary duty was to serve on ocean stations in the Atlantic Ocean to gather meteorological data. While on duty in one of these stations, she was required to patrol a 210-square-mile (544-square-kilometer) area for three weeks at a time, leaving the area only when physically relieved by another Coast Guard cutter or in the case of a dire emergency. While on station, she acted as an aircraft check point at the point of no return, a relay point for messages from ships and aircraft, as a source of the latest weather information for passing aircraft, as a floating oceanographic laboratory, and as a search-and-rescue ship for downed aircraft and vessels in distress, and performed law enforcement operations.

Humboldt was stationed at Boston, Massachusetts, from 29 March 1949 to September 1966. She was reclassified as a high endurance cutter and redesignated WHEC-372 on 1 May 1966. On 26 September 1966, her long-term loan from the Navy to the Coast Guard came to an end when she was transferred outright to the Coast Guard.

In September 1966, Humboldt shifted her home port to Portland, Maine. On 29 October 1968, she rescued the crew of the sailing ship Atlantic II.

== Decommissioning and disposal ==
The Coast Guard decommissioned Humboldt on 30 September 1969 and transferred her to the U.S. Navy. The Navy struck her from the Naval Vessel Register in 1970 and sold her for scrapping to Cantieri Navali, Genoa, Italy, for a bid amount of $60,000 (USD).
