= Montese =

- Comune
- Comune di Montese
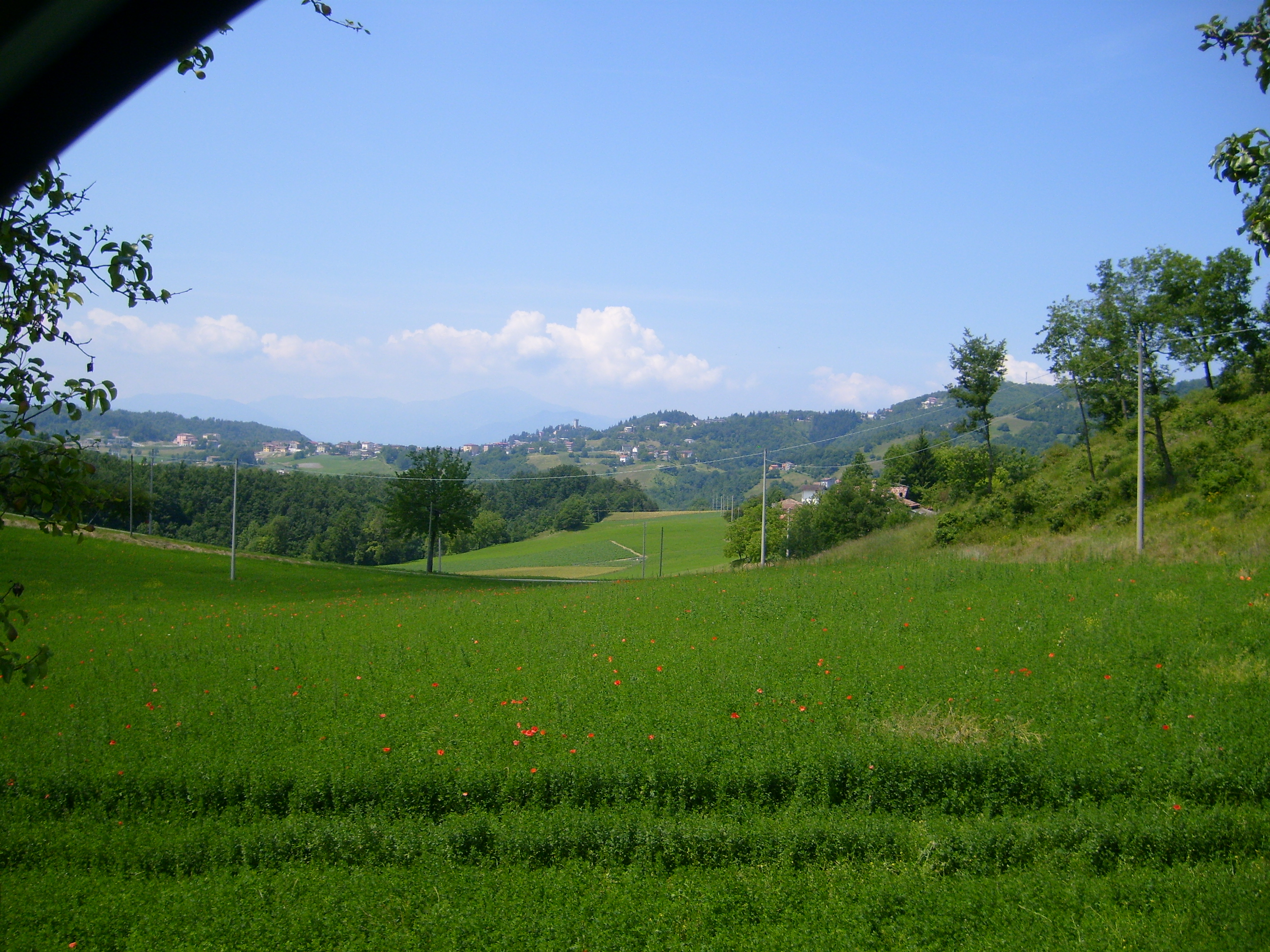

- Coat of arms

- Location within Italy Location within Emilia-Romagna
- Coordinates: 44°16′10″N 10°56′45″E
- Country: Italy
- Region: Emilia-Romagna
- Province: Modena (MO)
- Frazioni: Bertocchi, Castelluccio di Moscheda, Iola, Maserno, Montalto, Montespecchio, Salto, San Giacomo Maggiore, San Martino, Semelano

Government
  - Mayor: Matteo Deluca

Area
  - Total: 80.80 km^{2} (31.20 sq mi)
- Elevation: 842 m (2,762 ft)

Population (2023)
  - Total: 3,306
  - Density: 40.92/km^{2} (106.0/sq mi)
- Demonym: Montesini
- Time zone: UTC+1 (CET)
  - Summer (DST): UTC+2 (CEST)
- Postal code: 41055
- Dialing code: 059
- ISTAT code: 036026
- Patron saint: St. Lawrence
- Website: Official website

Montese (Frignanese: Muntês) is a town in the province of Modena, Emilia-Romagna, Italy.

During World War II, the town was liberated by Brazilian forces on 17 April 1945 after the Battle of Montese.

There are neighborhoods in the Brazilian cities of Fortaleza and Belém named after the Italian city, in homage to the three Brazilian soldiers who died in the battle to take Montese from the Germans during World War II.
