= Katai =

Katai may refer to:

- Katai, India
- Katai, Togo
- Aleksandar Katai (born 1991), Serbian footballer
- Yeerlanbieke Katai (born 1990), Chinese freestyle wrestler who competed at the 2016 Summer Olympics
- Kátai Tamás (born 1975), Hungarian avant-garde musician
- Katai Tayama (1872-1930), Japanese author
