= Kaon (disambiguation) =

Kaon may refer to:

- Kaon, a subatomic particle
- KAON, an ontology infrastructure
- Kaon Interactive, a video game developer of Terra (computer game)
- Kaon, a character in the Japanese manga Kyoshiro to Towa no Sora
- Kaón, former name of a mountain from Denia, Spain, now called Montgo
- Kaon, a city on Cybertron in Transformers: Prime, where Megatron began his reign as a Decepticon and made his capital
- KAONMEDIA, a South Korean company manufacturing connectivity devices.
- Birra Kaon, an Albanian beer.

== See also ==
- Kao (disambiguation)
