= Albert Bartholomé =

French painter and sculptor (1848–1928)

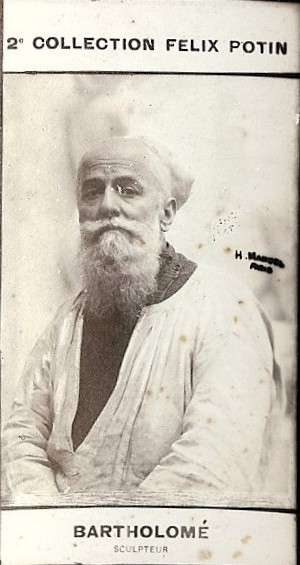
- Albert Bartholomé (Collection Félix Potin)
- Born: 4 August 1848; Thiverval-Grignon, France
- Died: 1928 (aged 79–80); Paris, France
- Education: École des Beaux-Arts
- Notable work: Fillette pleurant Croix de guerre
- Movement: Romantic; Art Nouveau
- Spouse: Prospérie de Fleury
- Awards: Grand Prize, 1900 Exposition Universelle

Paul-Albert Bartholomé was a French painter and sculptor.

He was born on 29 August 1848 in Thiverval-Grignon, Yvelines, France, and died in 1928 in Paris. He won the Grand Prize for sculpture at the Exposition Universelle in 1900. He exhibited paintings at the Salon from 1879 to 1886, but thereafter devoted his work to sculpture.

== Biography ==
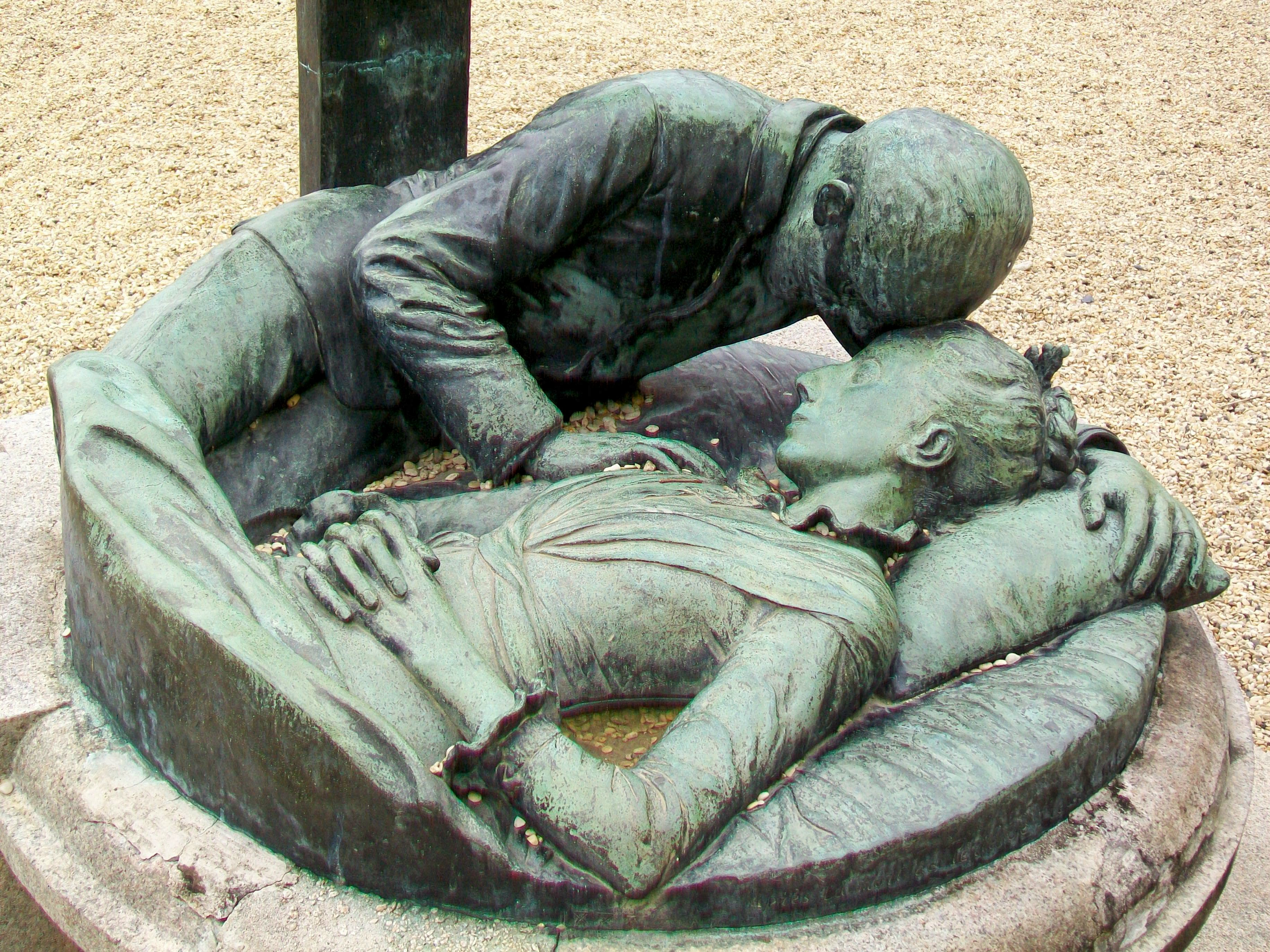
Bartholomé's sculpture on his wife's grave at Bouillant near Crépy-en-Valois. His first work of sculpture. He had trained as a painter but was persuaded to try sculpture by Degas and created a sculpture for his wife's grave.

He studied law and fought in the Franco-Prussian War in General Charles-Denis Bourbaki's army and became a prisoner in Switzerland. In due course he attended the École des Beaux-Arts in Paris where he studied painting under Barthélemy Menn and Jean-Léon Gérôme. He then set himself up in a studio in Paris and became a close friend of Edgar Degas. He married the daughter of a marquis, Prospérie de Fleury, but she died at a young age in 1887.

Much encouraged by Degas he decided to try his hand at sculpture and executed the moving sculpture which marked his wife's grave in Crépy-en-Valois. He now concentrated exclusively on sculpture and from 1891 onwards he exhibited each year at the yearly Salon of the Société nationale des Beaux-arts. Funerary sculpture was very much in vogue in France at that time and much of Bartholomé's is death related and his masterpiece is the monument in Père Lachaise Cemetery dedicated to all the dead.

He was to work on this for ten years and the inauguration took place in 1899. The "Monument the Dead" is disturbing and involves twenty-one larger-than-life-size figures all showing different emotions and reactions to death. There is little sentiment in this composition which is uncompromising, secular and human, although there is an inference that a "light" will defeat the darkness, with the inscription:

"Upon those who dwelt in the land of the shadow of death a light has dawned".

As a painter he was said to be influenced by Jules Bastien-Lepage.

== Main works ==
Name of sculpture	Location of sculpture	Date work executed	Notes	Image
Bust of Federico Zandomeneghi	Musée d'Orsay	1890	Zandomeneghi was an Italian painter. The museum hold the original plaster model.	
"Petite fille pleurant"	Musée d'Orsay	1894	A bronze shown at the 1894 Salon of the Société Nationale des Beaux-Arts. There are several copies in circulation. There is a marble version in L'Hermitage, in Paris' Petit Palais, and a limestone version in Copenhagen's Ny Carlsberg Glyptotek. A bronze limited edition was issued by Siot-Decauville.	
"Project for a Monument to the Dead"	Père Lachaise cemetery	1891-1895	In 1891 Bartholomé presented to the Salon de la Société Nationale des Beaux-Arts individual figures which would eventually be part of his great masterpiece and in 1895 submitted to the Salon the definitive version of his work, 10 metres long by 6 metres high, with the title "Project for a Monument to the Dead". It was an immense success and the French State and the city of Paris joined to commission a version in Euville stone which was erected at the end of the main walkway of the Père Lachaise cemetery. The unveiling took place on November 1, 1899, and on that first day almost 100,000 people visited the cemetery. The Art Institute of Chicago has a bronze dating to 1900 entitled "Lamenting Group" which is a copy of the group to the left of the tomb's entrance. This can be seen in the gallery below. The monument takes the form of an Egyptian Mastaba and the upper tier shows a couple passing from life to death through the entrance to the tomb and around the entrance are two other groups of people. Below we see death itself with a dead couple and their child whilst "l'Esprit de vie et de lumière" extends her arms towards them. The group to the left, hide their faces, hide their grief and despair and these are those left behind on the death of a loved one. The group on the right, equally despairing, are those about to die and enter the tomb.	

== Images of the Père-Lachaise – Monument aux morts ==
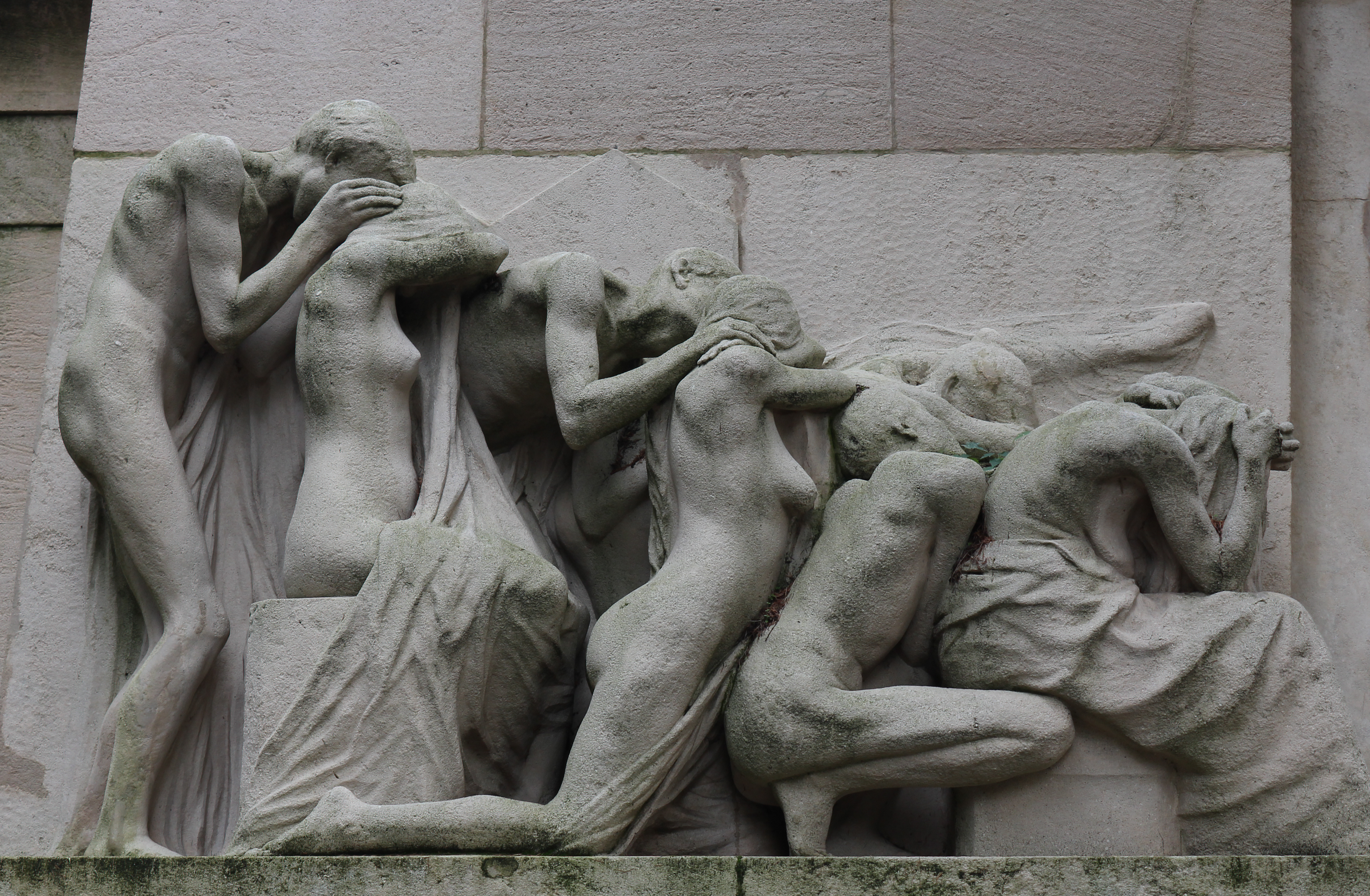
The group to the left of the tomb's entrance. All shield their faces from view. Note the perfect geometric line as their height reduces from the man standing to the far left to the seated woman on the far right.

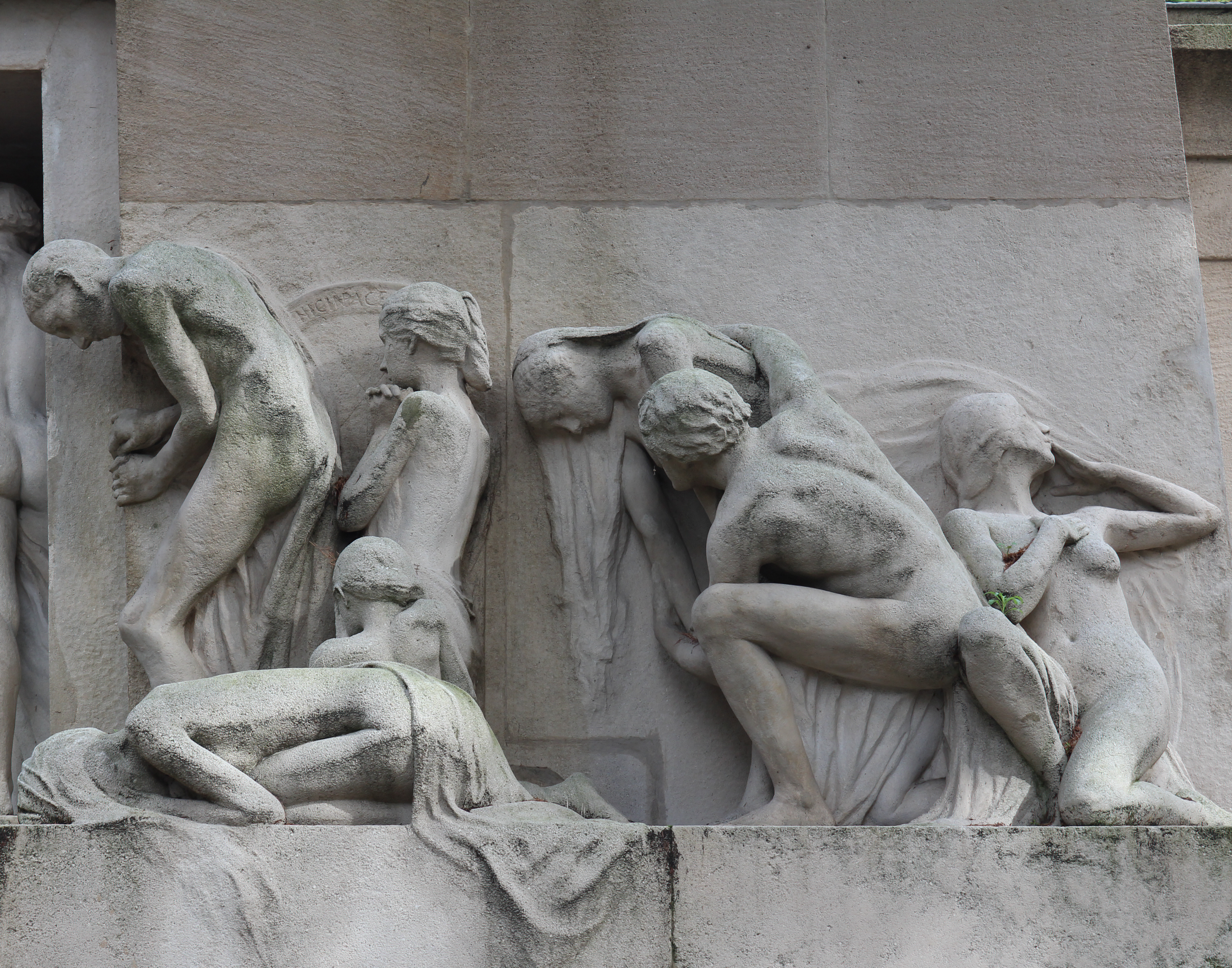
The group to the right. The geometric line is reversed. The man at the front is stooped and his hands grip the edge of the entrance. Behind him one woman lies prostrate whilst another is knelt in prayer. Next we see a man supporting a woman and at the end a woman turns appearing to blow a farewell kiss.

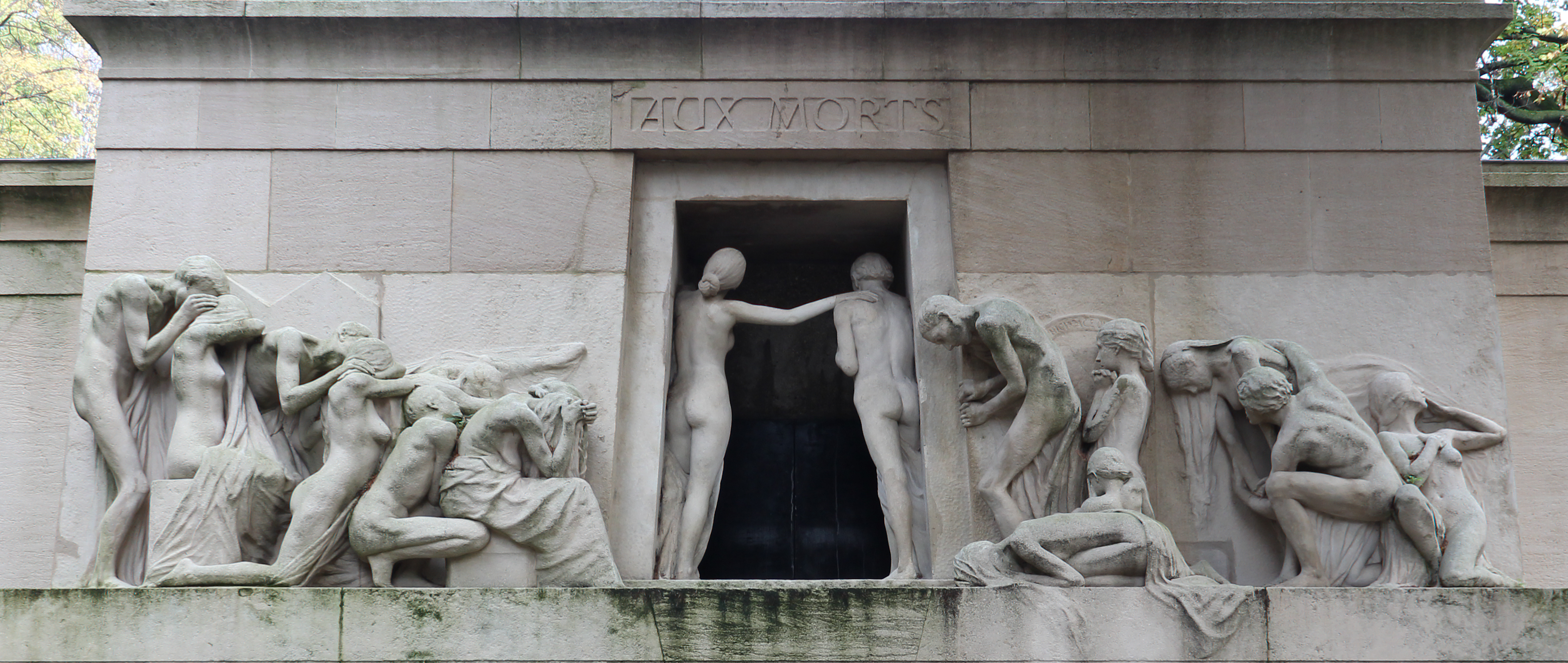
A couple enter the darkness of the tomb.

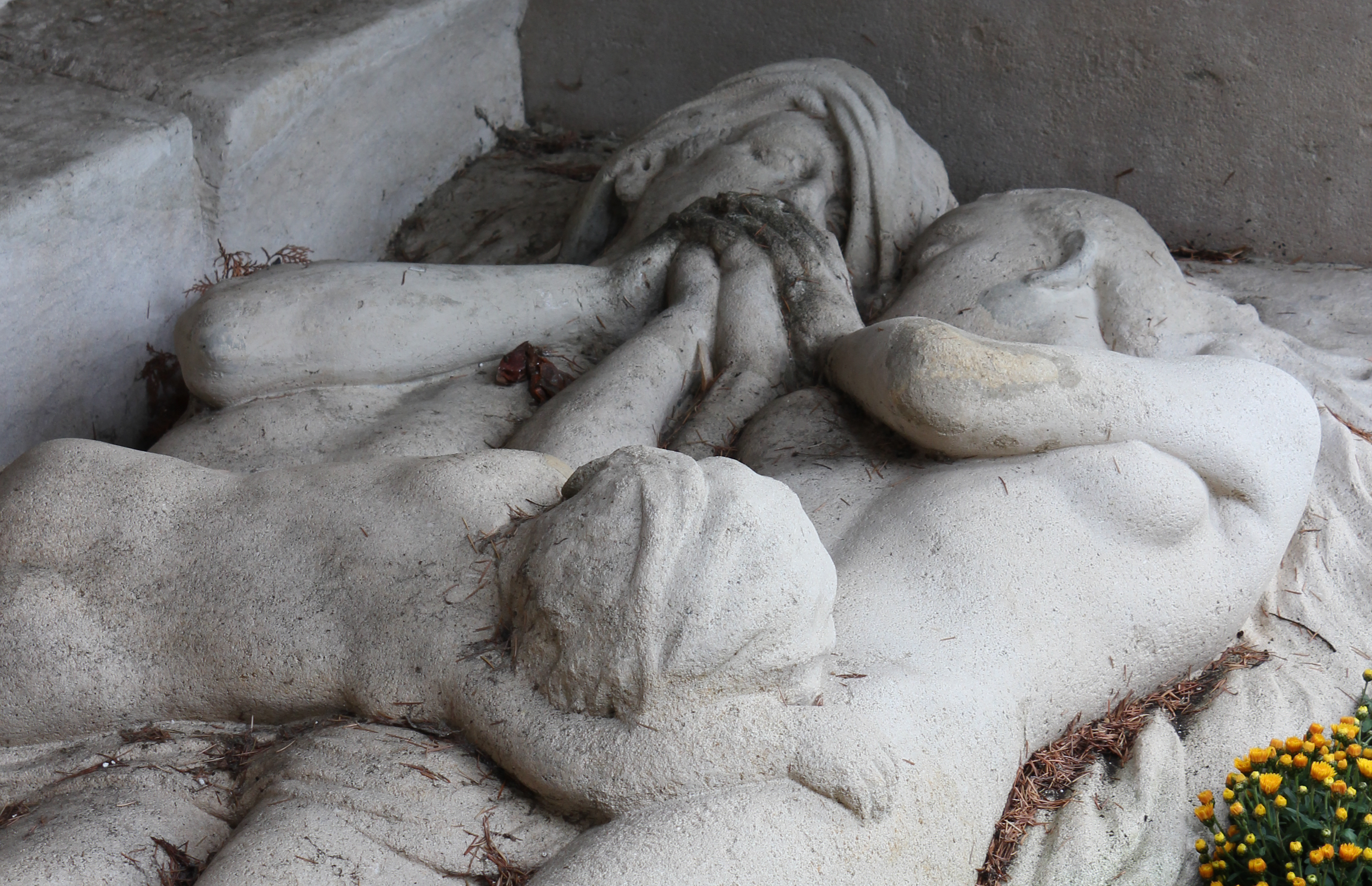
In a section of the tomb an angel shines a light over a dead couple across whose chests lies a dead child.

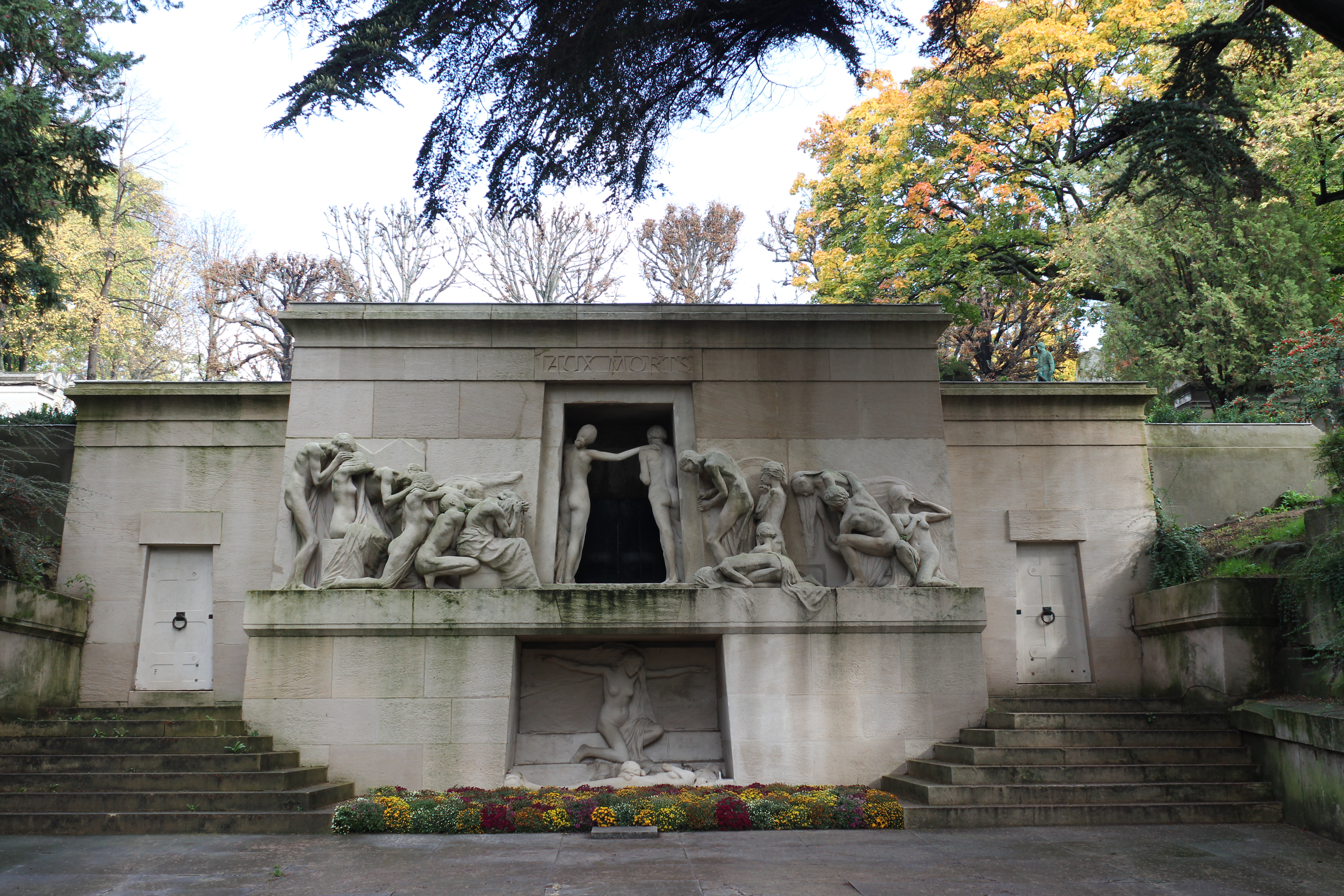
A view of the entire monument after restoration.

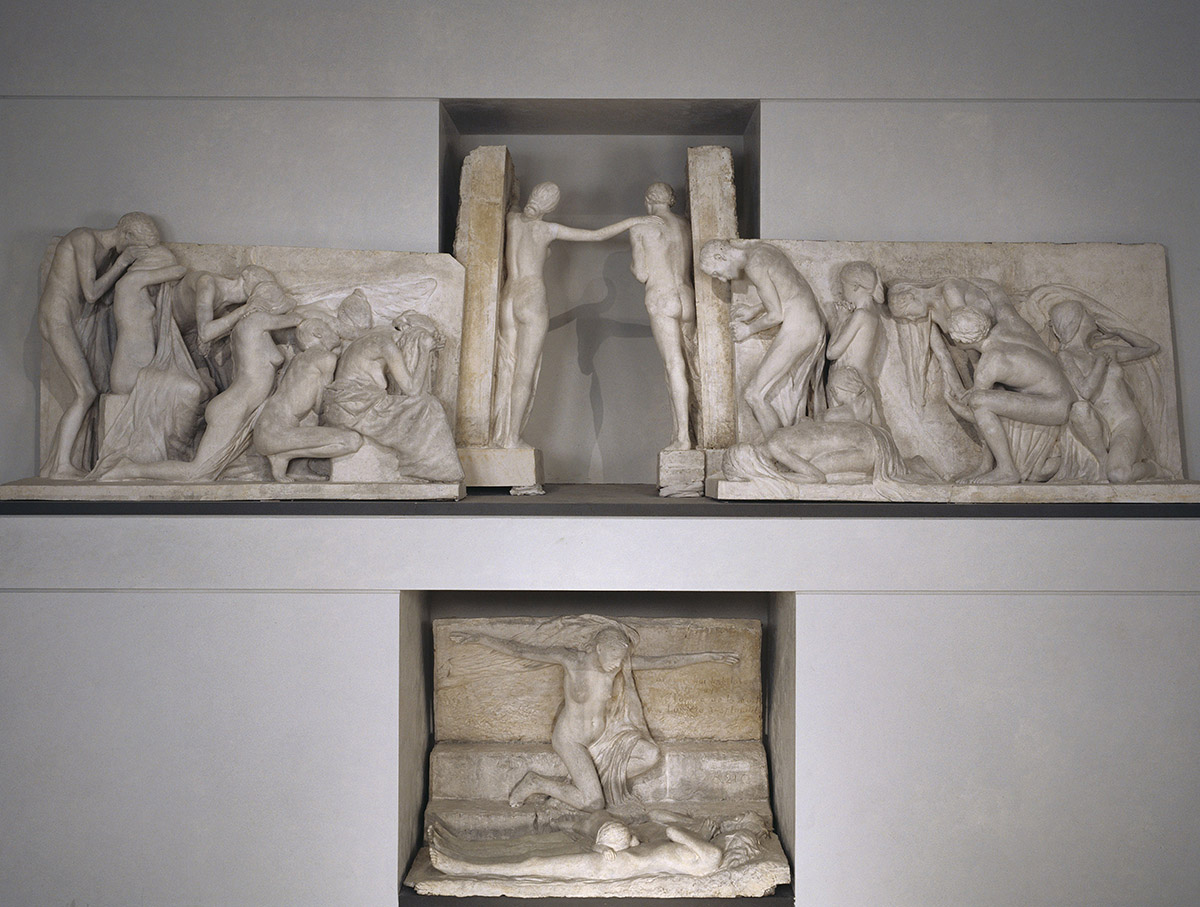
Plaster model of the monument at the Musée des Beaux-Arts, Lyon

== Main works (continued) ==
Name of sculpture	Location of sculpture	Date work executed	Notes	Image
Mask of Tadamasa Hayashi	Musée d'Orsay	1892	Tadamasa Hayashi was an art dealer who did much to promote Japanese culture in Paris between 1878 and 1902. The mask is in bronze with a red patina. A bronze version with a black patina is held by the Musée des Beaux-Arts et de la Dentelle in Calais and another with the red patina is held by the Takaoka Art Museum. Shown at the Salon of the Société nationale des Beaux-Arts in 1894	
Madame Guillaume Dubufe	Musée d'Orsay	1895	A statuette in marble shown at the Salon of the Société nationale des beaux-arts in 1895. Dubufe was a French painter. Bartholomé was also commissioned to execute a white marble bas-relief for the Dubufe tomb in Père-Lachaise. This tomb was also the burial place of Dubufe's daughter, the painter and sculptor Juliette Dubufe.	
"Adam and Eve"	Hermitage Museum. Saint Petersburg	1900	A version of "Adam and Eve" in Saint Petersburg	
The tomb of Henri Meilhac	Cimetière Montmartre. Paris	1900	Another "Douleur" created for the tomb of the French librettist Henri Meilhac	
Tomb of Pam family	Cimetière Montmartre. Paris	1902	Bartholomé's marble sculpture of a caryatid decorates this tomb. The sculpture was exhibited at the 1902 Salon of the Société Nationale des Beaux-Arts.	
"Le Printemps. Le chant du Mariage"	Musée d'Orsay	1906	A commemorative plaque in silver copper. There is also a copy of the plaque in the Paris Musée des Arts décoratifs and another in Brême.	
Bust of Madame Bartholomé	Musée d'Orsay	1908	Madame Bartholomé née Florence Letessier became Bartholomé's second wife in 1901, fourteen years after the death of Propérie de Fleury. The work was shown at the Salon of the Société nationale des Beaux-Arts in 1908.	
The tomb of Honoré Champion	Montparnasse Cemetery	align="center"		
Monument to Jean-Jacques Rousseau	Pantheon	1910	The inauguration of this monument took place on 30 June 1912. The central part of the work depicts three seated women, allegories for "La Philosophie, la Vérité et la Nature". The work was shown at the 1910 Salon of the Société nationale des Beaux-Arts. To the right of the three women stands Bartholomé's "La Gloire" and a smaller plaster model of the work can be seen in the Orléans, Musée des Beaux-Arts, with a marble version, also smaller in size, being held by Rouen's Musée des Beaux-Arts. A medallion depicting Jean-Jacques Rousseau also features as part of the Panthéon monument and the Musée d'Orsay hold a copy. "La Musique" completed the composition, this allegory standing on the left-hand side of the three seated women. All three works were completed in 1910 and the Musée d'Orsay hold plaster models of them. Again versions of "La Musique" can be seen in Orléans and Rouen.	
			The work "La Gloire" was used for three monument aux morts. A version in bronze stands proudly on the memorial at Cormeilles-en-Parisis in the Val d'Oise, see image below. It also decorates the memorial at Saint-Jean-d'Angély in Charente Maritime and Plazac the latter being a smaller version.	
"Jeune fille se coiffant"	Musée des Beaux-Arts Bordeaux	1917	A high-relief in limestone depicting a young woman doing her hair.	
The Croix de Guerre			Bartholomé designed the Croix de guerre 1914–1918 (France).	
Le Creusot War Memorial (monument aux morts)	Le Creusot	1919	When in 1919 Eugène Schneider decided to build a memorial to the Le Creusot workers who died in the 1914-1918 war and to his son Henri-Paul who was killed in aerial combat in 1918 over Aspach he approached Bartholomé to carry out the sculptural work. The project was abandoned and in due course another sculptor was found but Bartholomé had already had two of the figures involved cast in bronze as well as the bas-reliefs. These can be seen at the l'Académie François Bourdon.	
Montbrison War Memorial (monument aux morts)	Montbrison	1919	Inaugurated 24 May 1920. The monument bears the names of the men of Montbrison who were killed in the 1914-1918 war. It also includes a bust of Emile Reymond, a politician and aviator killed in 1914. The memorial was transferred in 1980 to the Jardin d'Allard. In Bartholomé's composition four soldiers surround the bust of Reymond which sits on a pedestal inscribed "Dr EMILE REYMOND SENATOR DE LA LOIRE APOTRE DE L'AVIATION MORT AU CHAMP D'HONNEUR 1865-1914" At the side of this group are reliefs of two female figures, that on the left an allegory for medicine and that on the right an allegory for aviation.	
"La Douleur"	Musée d'Orsay	1920	The museum holds a marble replica of the representation of "Grief" which decorated the monument to the authors and dramatic composers who gave their lives in the 1914-1918 war. The work, but in stone, was shown at the 1914 Salon and is held in the Musée de Barentin. A version in biscuit was made by Sèvres.	
Monument aux Morts at Crépy-en-Valois	Crépy-en-Valois. Oise	1925	Crépy-en-Valois' war memorial features a woman weeping over the corpse of a dead soldier, a replica of the "le soldat gisant" statue commissioned in 1918 by Marie Henriette Bernard de Sassenay, for the tomb of her son, Jacques Benoist de Laumont. Albert Bartholomé completed the Crépy-en-Valois sculpture for free in memory of his deceased wife who had been born in the nearby village of Bouillant. It was inaugurated on 11 November 1925. It was Albert Bartholomé who was responsible for the famous Monument aux Morts in the Pere Lachaise cemetery. See detail from this Monument aux Morts below. There is also a notable Bartholomé sculpture in nearby Bouillant this being for the grave of his wife.	
Cognac War Memorial (monument aux morte)	Cognac	1921/1922	The war memorial stands in the Boulevard Denfert Rochereau and Bartholomé's white marble sculpture depicts two women both holding the one sword, one an allegory for the 1870 war and the other the 1914-1918 war. The victor of 1918 supports the loser of 1870. The first woman, head held high, and wearing an infantryman's helmet, is an allegory for the victorious France of 1918. She consoles her colleague, whose head is covered by a widow's shroud and who represents the France defeated by the Prussians in 1870.	
Soissons War Memorial (monument aux morts)	Soissons	1914	At Soissons, the war memorial has four standing statues by Bartholomé and a series of bas-reliefs by sculptor and medallist Raoul Lamourdedieu It was as late as 21 July 1935 that Soissons finally saws her monument aux morts unveiled by the President, Albert Lebrun. The Soissons monument had first been designed by Bartholome in 1914 as a monument to celebrate the history of Soissons but it was decided to create the memorial as the city's monument aux morts and it was erected in 1926. However the Great War veterans ("Les Anciens Combattants") were unhappy with Bartholomé's statue of a woman at the very top of the monument, the so-called "Dame Blanche", and after much discussion the "Dame Blanche" was moved to a position in the St Crepin park and eventually replaced on the top of the monument aux morts by the four men carrying an "eternal flame" which was completed by a pupil of Lamourdedieu. The monument comprises a central pedestal with the "eternal flame" at the very top and Lamourdedieu's reliefs are on the sides of the pedestal. At each corner of the monument are Bartholomé statues. In the middle section of the pedestal there are bas-reliefs on the south and east facing sides. In one Lamourdedieu depicts a group of soldiers and in the other a winged female figure representing "Victory" protects another two soldiers, one of whom is wounded. On the west-facing side of the lower part of the pedestal the bas-relief depicts the King of France and Joan of Arc entering Soissons on horseback on 23 June 1429 and on the south-facing side the bas-relief depicts the story of the "Vase of Soissons". A soldier is seen crushing the vase under the eyes of Clovis and the messengers of St Remigius. The north-facing bas-relief shows the evacuation of the city. The statue on the north west side depicted a "citizen" holding a scroll. The inscription reads "1181. Abolition des Servitudes Feodales a Soissons" In the south west corner is a knight carrying a sword. The inscription tells his story "923. Carolingien defenseur de Soissons. Capital Franque" The south east and north east facing corners have statues depicting French soldiers of the Great War.	
Monument aux Morts des Écrivains et gens de Lettres			This monument is dedicated to all writers and men of letters who gave their lives for France 1914–1918. It is in the garden of the rue Ballu in Paris (hôtel de la rue Henner).	
War Memorial (monument aux morts)	Palais de Justice Paris		In the Salle des Pas Perdus is Bartholome's memorial dedicated to all those members of the French judiciary who gave their lives in the 1914-1918 war. A robed judge places a soldier's helmet on the head of a lawyer.	

== Note ==
In 1924 Bartholome executed a monument to Victorien Sardou which was erected by a public fountain in the Place de la Madeleine. In bronze the sculpture depicted a seated Sardou and behind him were allegories of comedy and drama. In 1941 the Germans had the monument dismantled so that the bronze could be melted down and reused.

== Gallery of images ==
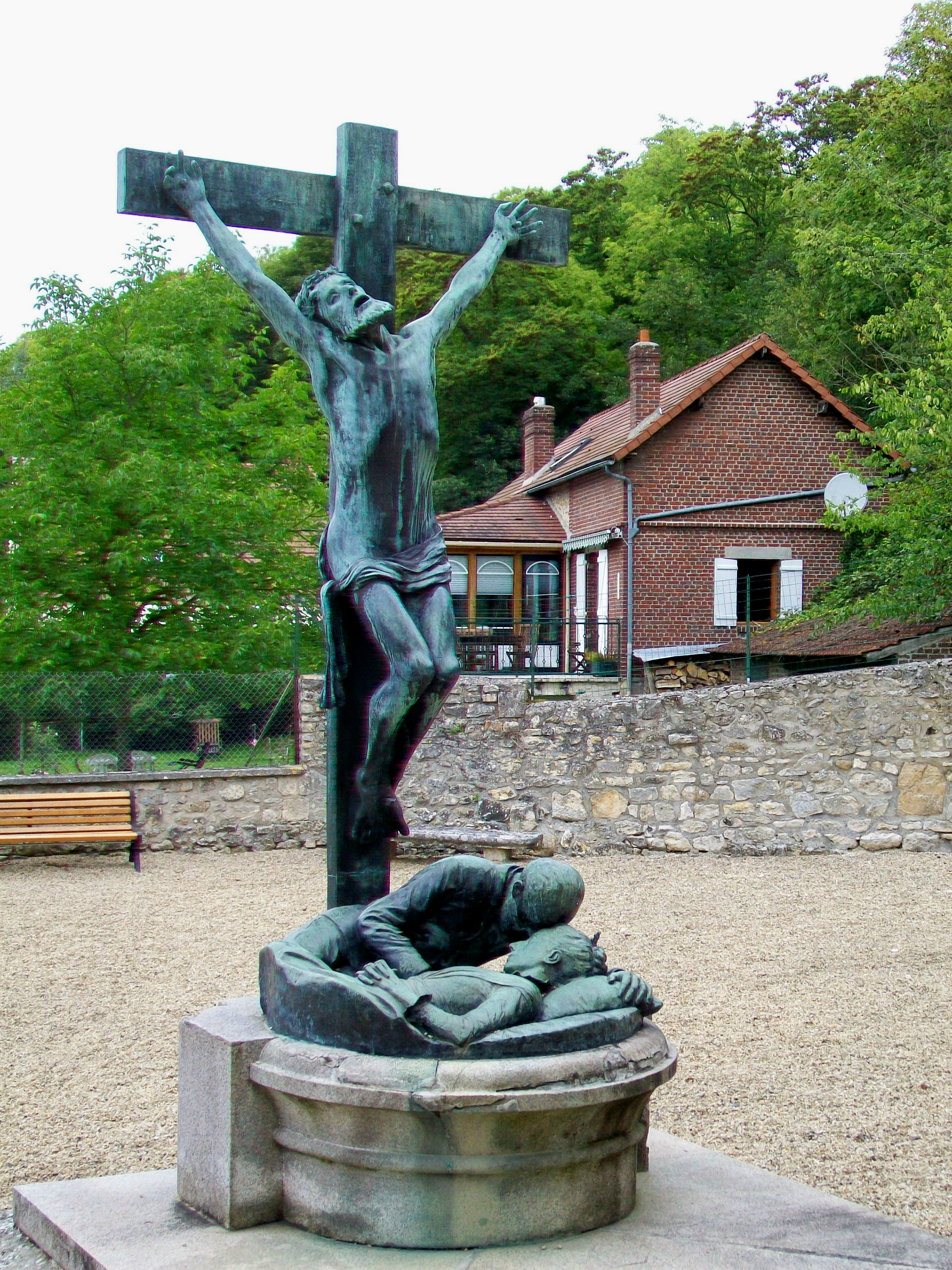
Bartholomé's sculpture on his wife's grave at Bouillant near Crépy-en-Valois

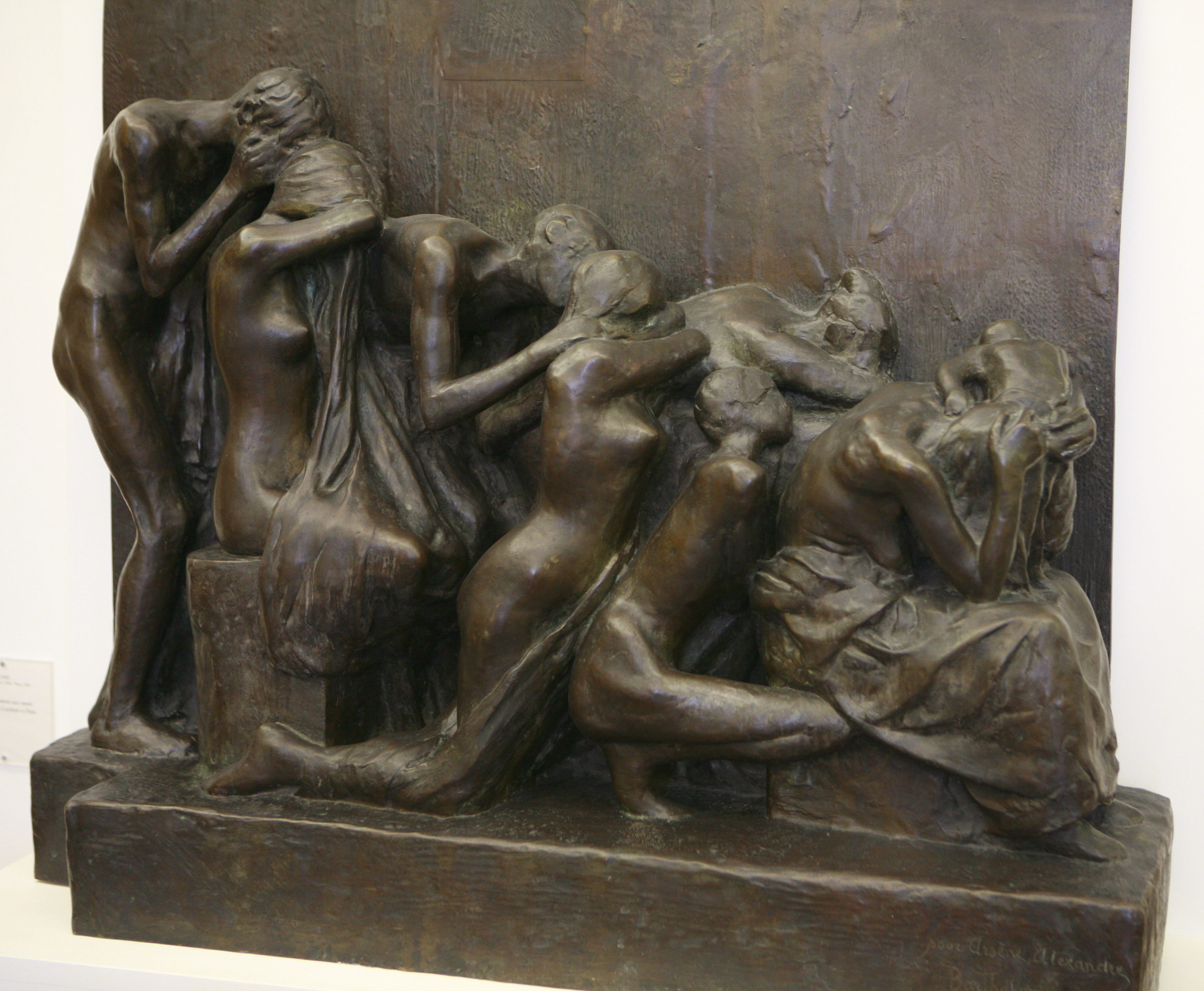
Bartholomé work at Père Lachaise.

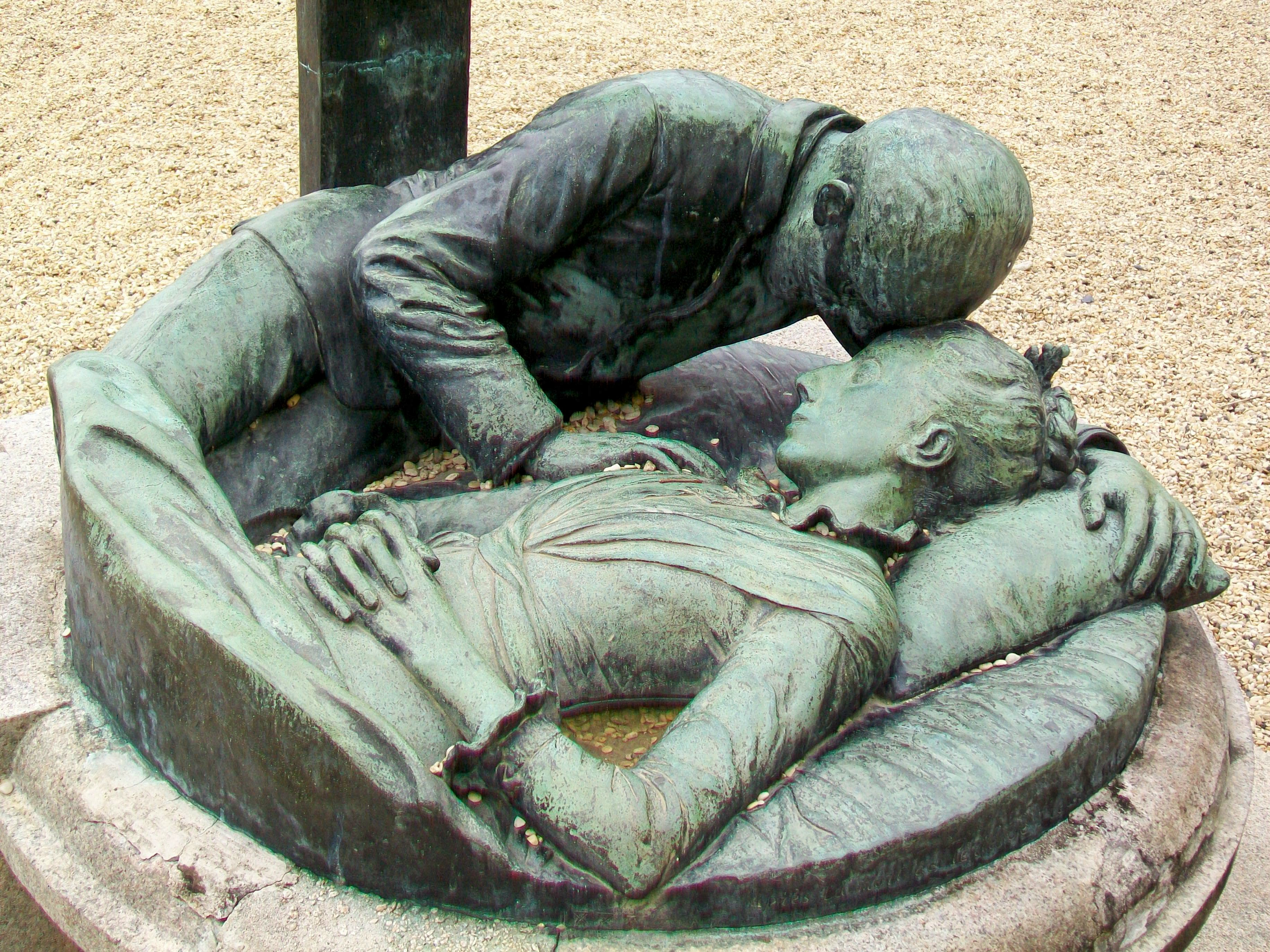
Bartholomé's sculpture on his wife's grave at Bouillant near Crépy-en-Valois

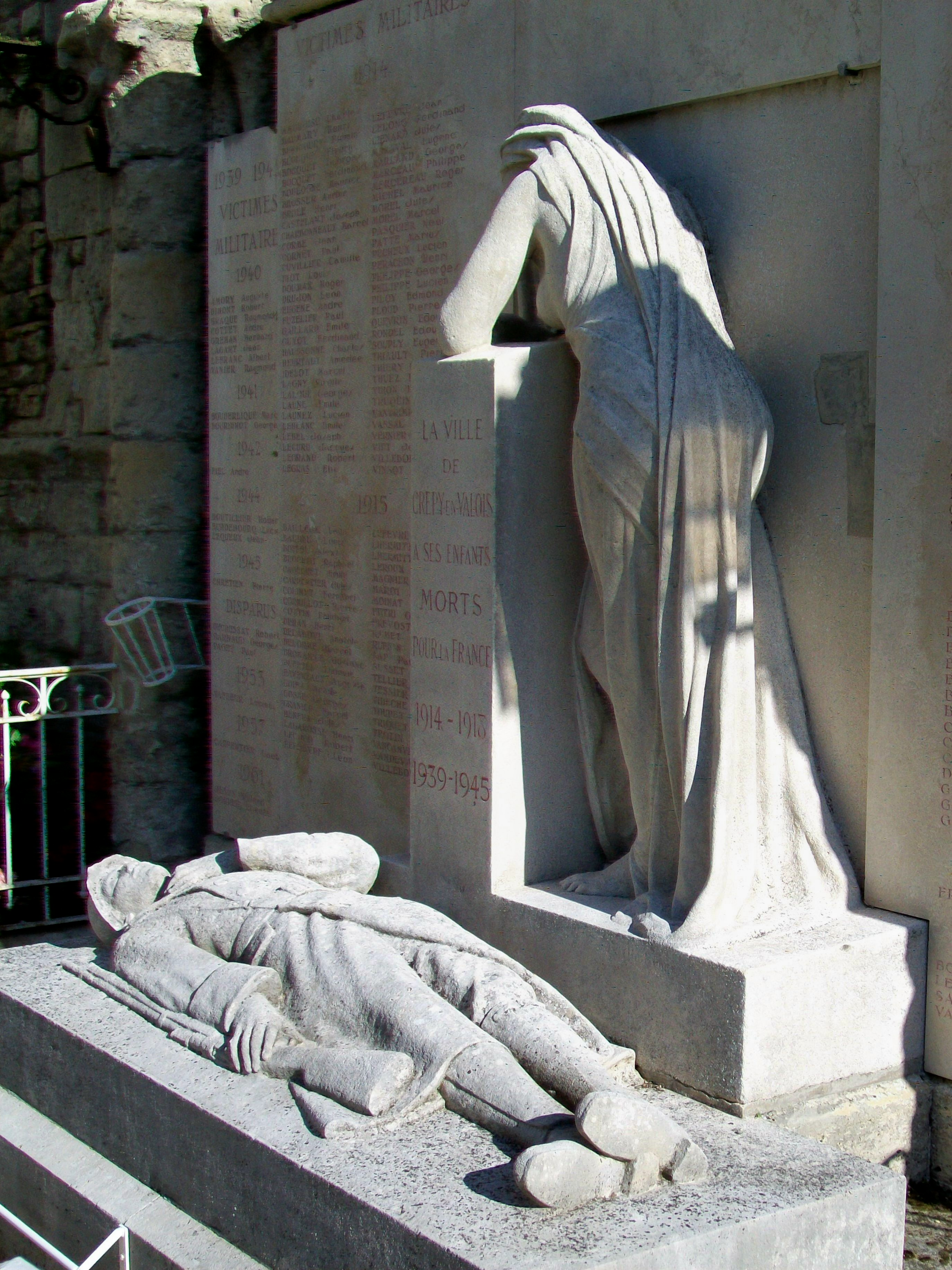
The Crépy-en-Valois war memorial

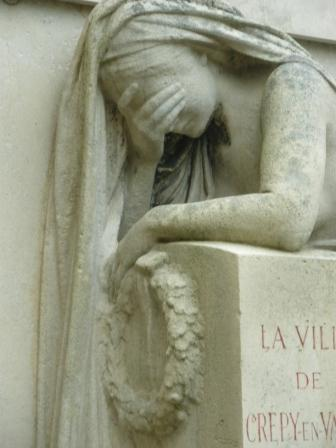
A close-up of a section of the Crépy-en-Valois war memorial

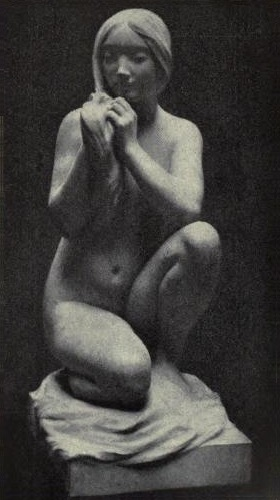
Young Girl dressing her Hair

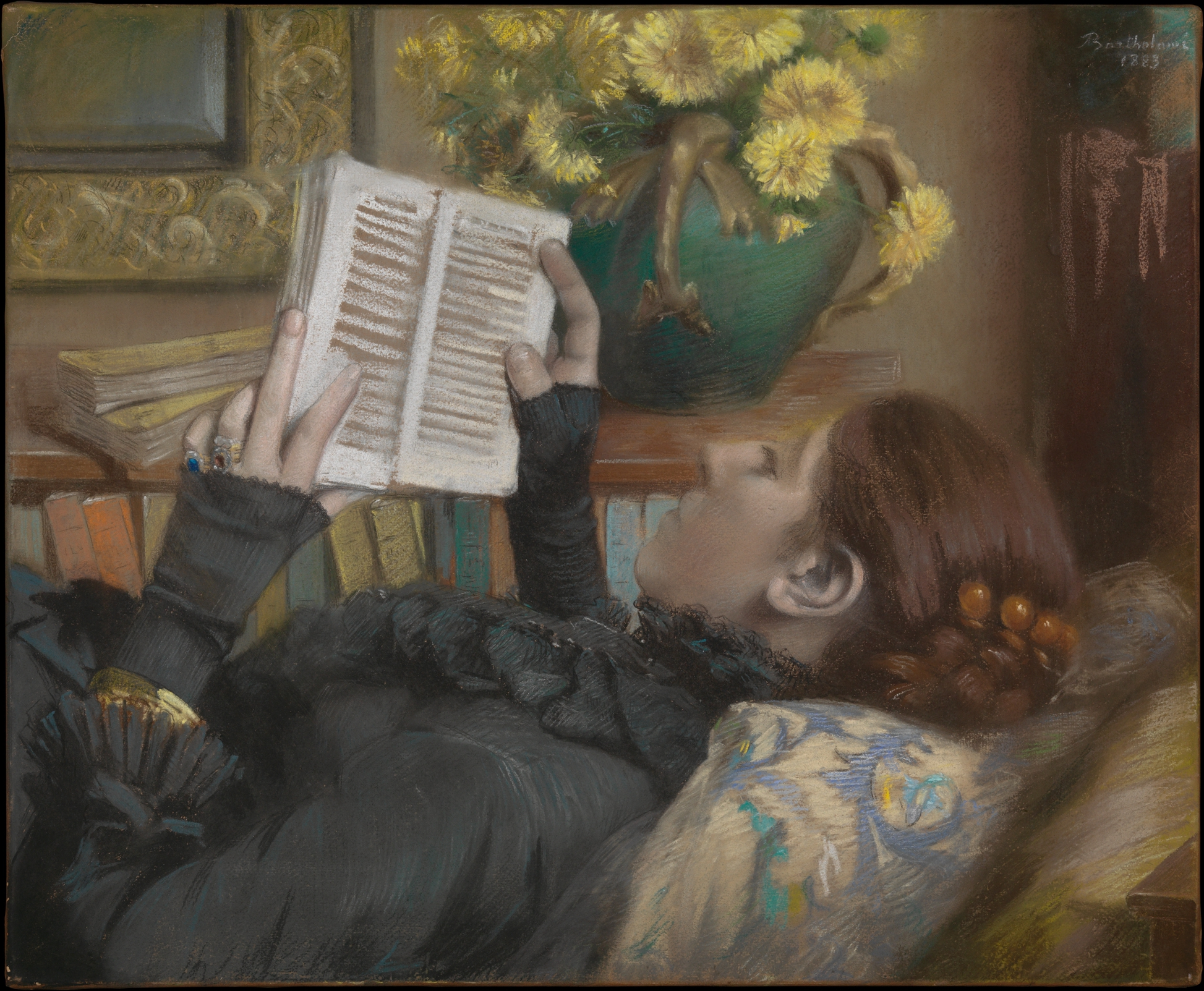
The artist's wife reading, 1883

== See also ==
- War memorials (Aisne)- See Soissons entry
- War memorials (Oise)-See entry on Monument aux Morts at Crépy-en-Valois
- In the Conservatory (Bartholomé)
