= Gado =

Gado may refer to:

- Gado or gad, a short name for a gadolinium containing contrast dye often used in MRI medical imaging
- Gado (comics), Godfrey Mwampembwa, Kenyan political cartoonist
- Gado (Star Wars), a race in Star Wars
- Jadu, Libya, a town in northwestern Libya also known as Gado
- Gado or Ga-do, an island in North Korea
- Gado-gado, an Indonesian salad

== See also ==
- Gato (disambiguation)
- Kado (disambiguation)
