= Gande =

Gande may refer to:

- Gande (river), a river in Lower Saxony, Germany
- Gande County (甘德县), Golog Prefecture, Qinghai, China
- Gande, Anxi County (感德镇), a town in Anxi County, Fujian, China
- Gande, Togo, a village in Kara Region of north-eastern Togo
