= Dako (disambiguation) =

Dako is a village in Togo. Dako may also refer to:

== People ==
- Dako Radošević (1934–2021), Bosnian discus thrower
- Andrea Dakó (born 1972), Hungarian badminton player
- Kristo Dako (1880–1941), Albanian patriot
- Owusu Dako (born 1973), British sprinter
- Sevasti Qiriazi-Dako (ca. 1871–1949), Albanian patriot
- Vangjush Dako, Albanian politician

== Other uses ==
- Mudoko dako, effeminate male who is considered by Langi society to be a different gender
- Rokkaku dako, Japanese fighter kite

== See also ==
- Dakos
