= Taou =

- Location in Togo
- Coordinates: 9°20′N 1°8′E
- Country: Togo
- Region: Kara Region
- Prefecture: Assoli
- Time zone: UTC + 0

Taou is a village in the Assoli prefecture in the Kara Region of north-eastern Togo.
