= Saint-Jean-d'Angély =

Saint-Jean-d'Angély Sént-Jhan-d'Anjhéli (Poitevin–Saintongeais)
- Subprefecture and commune
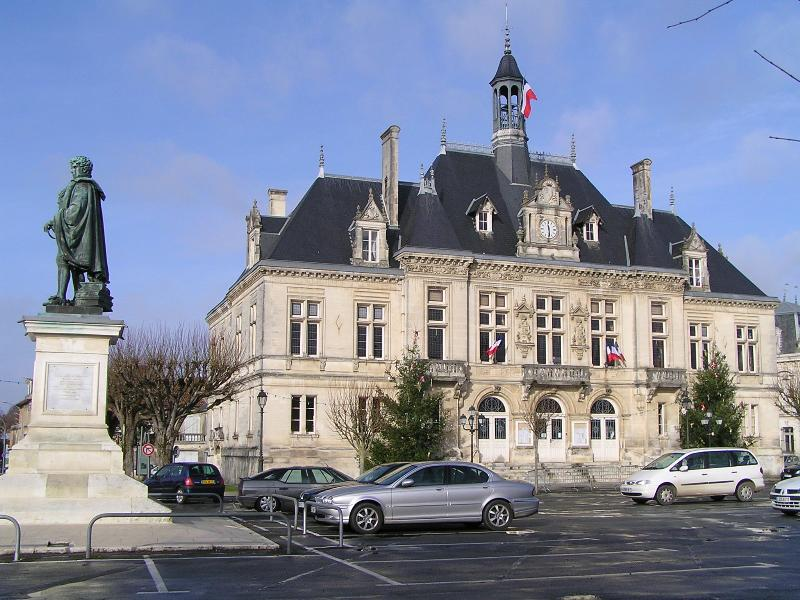
- The town hall in Saint-Jean-d'Angély

- Coat of arms
- Location of Saint-Jean-d'Angély
- Location within France Location within Nouvelle-Aquitaine
- Coordinates: 45°56′48″N 0°31′46″W
- Country: France
- Region: Nouvelle-Aquitaine
- Department: Charente-Maritime
- Arrondissement: Saint-Jean-d'Angély
- Canton: Saint-Jean-d'Angély

Government
  - Mayor (2020–2026): Françoise Mesnard (PS)
- Area^{1}: 18.78 km^{2} (7.25 sq mi)
- Elevation: 4 m (13 ft)
- Highest elevation: 76 m (249 ft)
- Lowest elevation: 8 m (26 ft)
- Population (2023): 6,784
  - Density: 361.2/km^{2} (935.6/sq mi)
- Time zone: UTC+01:00 (CET)
  - Summer (DST): UTC+02:00 (CEST)
- INSEE/Postal code: 17347 /17400
- ^{1} French Land Register data, which excludes lakes, ponds, glaciers > 1 km^{2} (0.386 sq mi or 247 acres) and river estuaries.

Saint-Jean-d'Angély (French pronunciation: [sɛ̃ ʒɑ̃ dɑ̃ʒeli]; Saintongeais: Sént-Jhan-d'Anjhéli) is a commune in the Charente-Maritime department in southwestern France.

The commune has its historical origins in the Abbey of Saint-Jean-d'Angély.

== Royal abbey ==
Founded in the ninth century to house a relic of Saint John the Baptist, and rebuilt in the 14th, 17th and 18th centuries because of repeated destruction, then later abandoned, the Abbey is now a listed building. It remains the most remarkable piece of architecture of Saint-Jean-d'Angély, a town which has kept all its medieval charm. Situated on the pilgrim route that led to Santiago de Compostela the edifice still constitutes a major stopping-off point towards Santiago de Compostela. Since 1989, the Royal Abbey has housed the Centre of European Culture, which has breathed new life into the Abbey by restoring it as a historical and cultural site and as a place for the exchange of ideas.

From 1989 to 1997, the restoration of the monastic buildings has been carried out according to the needs of the Centre of European Culture, with an emphasis placed on accommodations, catering, as well as rooms for conferences, reunions and workshops. The Centre has been at the forefront of the revitalization of the building, to such a point that today the Centre and the Abbey have been linked in the minds of the residents.

== Centre of European culture ==
The Centre of European Culture at Saint-Jean-d'Angély, created in 1989 as a joint initiative taken by the Minister of Culture, the town of Saint-Jean-d'Angély, the regional council of Poitou-Charentes and the council of Charente Maritime, has hosted multinational sessions focused on European culture and citizenship that are dedicated to youngsters sixteen to nineteen years, coming from all European countries.

== Geography ==
The Boutonne flows northwest through the commune; the town lies on its right bank.

== Twin towns – sister cities ==
- Koumondè, Togo
- Mondsee, Austria
- New Iberia, United States
- Saint-Sulpice, Canada

== Population ==
Historical population

Year	Pop.	±% p.a.
1793	6,059	—
1800	5,400	−1.63%
1806	5,351	−0.15%
1821	5,541	+0.23%
1831	6,031	+0.85%
1836	5,915	−0.39%
1841	6,107	+0.64%
1846	6,484	+1.21%
1851	6,413	−0.22%
1856	6,203	−0.66%
1861	6,392	+0.60%
1866	7,023	+1.90%
1872	6,812	−0.51%
1876	7,172	+1.30%
1881	7,279	+0.30%
1886	7,255	−0.07%
1891	7,297	+0.12%
1896	7,183	−0.31%
1901	7,041	−0.40%

Year	Pop.	±% p.a.
1906	7,087	+0.13%
1911	7,060	−0.08%
1921	6,541	−0.76%
1926	6,745	+0.62%
1931	6,610	−0.40%
1936	6,728	+0.35%
1946	7,280	+0.79%
1954	7,929	+1.07%
1962	8,660	+1.11%
1968	9,739	+1.98%
1975	9,642	−0.14%
1982	8,820	−1.26%
1990	8,060	−1.12%
1999	7,681	−0.53%
2007	7,463	−0.36%
2012	7,468	+0.01%
2017	6,976	−1.35%
2023	6,784	−0.46%

Source: EHESS and INSEE (1968–2023)

== See also ==
- Communes of the Charente-Maritime department
