= Djandje =

- Location in Togo
- Coordinates: 9°23′N 1°19′E
- Country: Togo
- Region: Kara Region
- Prefecture: Assoli
- Time zone: UTC + 0

Djandje is a village in the Assoli prefecture in the Kara region of north-eastern Togo.
