= Peou =

- Location in Togo
- Coordinates: 9°24′N 1°19′E
- Country: Togo
- Region: Kara
- Prefecture: Assoli
- Time zone: UTC + 0

Peou is a village in the Assoli prefecture in the Kara Region of north-eastern Togo.
