= Alédjo Wildlife Reserve =

Protected area in Togo

Alédjo Wildlife Reserve Réserve de faune d'Aledjo
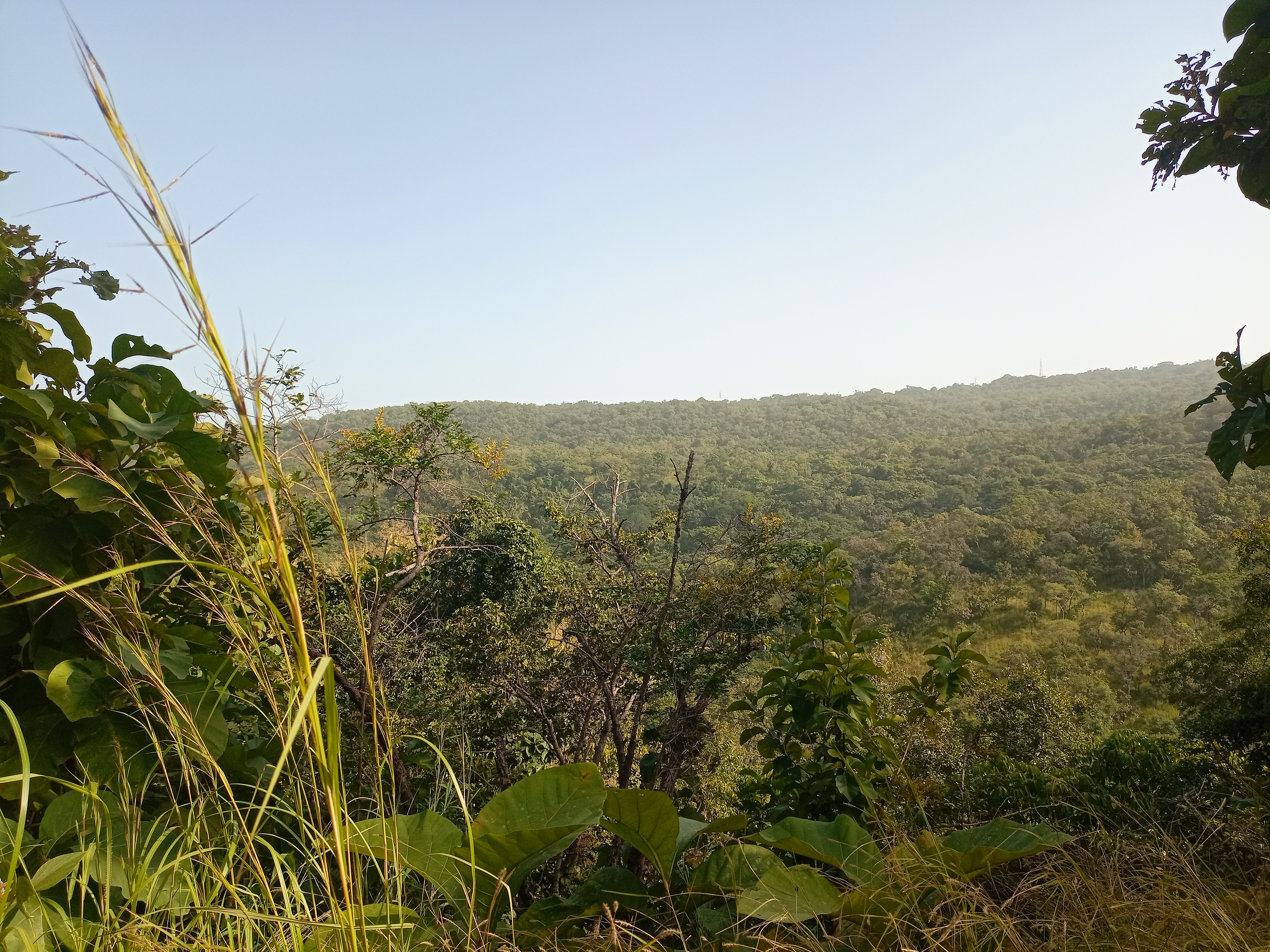

- Location within Togo
- Interactive map of Alédjo Wildlife Reserve; Réserve de faune d'Aledjo
- Location: Kara, Centrale, Togo
- Coordinates: 9°15′32″N 1°10′47″E
- Area: 7.65 km^{2} (2.95 sq mi)

The Alédjo Wildlife Reserve is located in the Tchaoudjo and Assoli Prefectures in Togo. The wildlife reserve consists of some 765 total hectares of protected areas with biological diversity and geological formations. It is a tourist destination, known for its natural environment and wildlife.

== World Heritage Status ==
This site was added to the UNESCO World Heritage Tentative List on January 8, 2002 in the Mixed (Cultural and Natural) category.
