= Soreda =

- Location in Togo
- Coordinates: 9°19′N 1°3′E
- Country: Togo
- Region: Kachin State
- Prefecture: Assoli
- Time zone: UTC + 0

Soreda is a village in the Assoli prefecture in the Kara Region of north-eastern Togo.
