= Assoli Prefecture =

Prefecture in Kara, Togo

Coordinates: 9°21′N 1°16′E

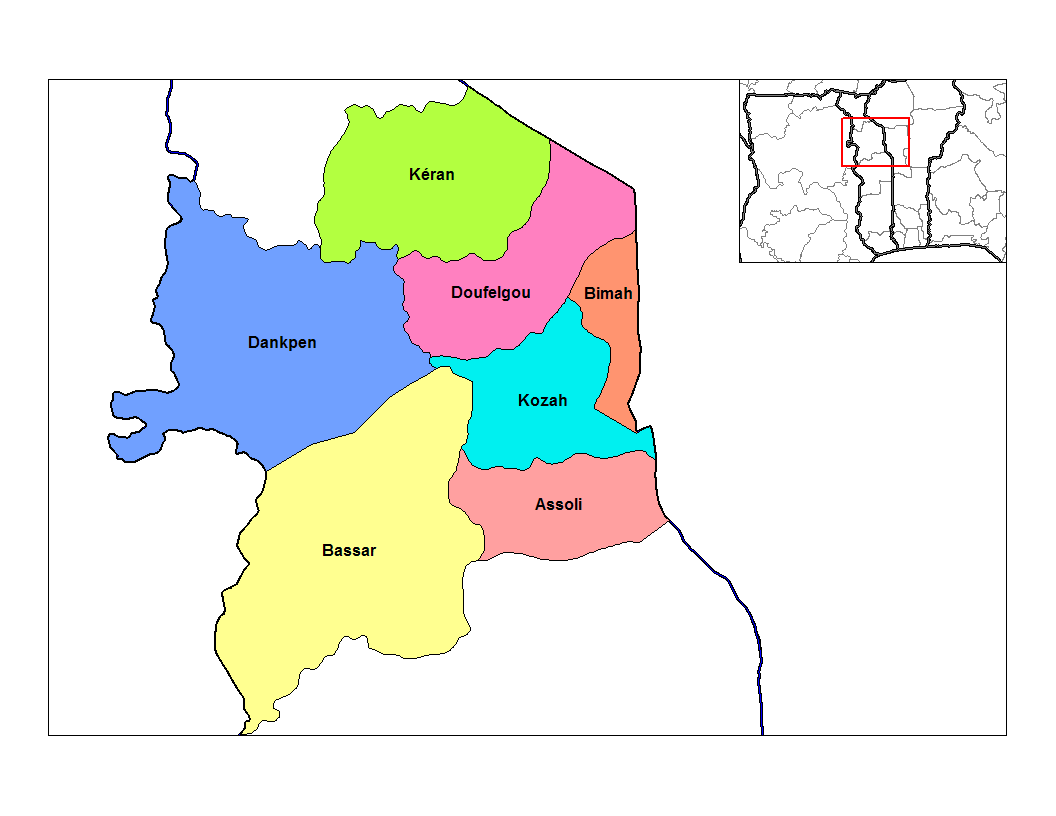
Prefectures of Kara

Assoli is a prefecture located in the Kara Region of Togo. The capital city is Bafilo. At the time of the 2022 census it had a population of 66,394 people.

The cantons (or subdivisions) of Assoli include Bafilo, Dako, Koumondè, Soudou, Alédjo and Bouladè.

== Towns and villages ==
Abakouande, Afoudi, Agarade, Agbandaode, Agouebou, Akoutia, Aledjame, Aledjo Kadara, Aleheride, Bafilo, Bodoude, Bola, Bomboua, Dako, Djandje, Djanguela, Doukorode, Effolo, Fadao, Fazade, Flandi, Foulenda, Gande, Gnata, Groungouboui, Hungbeu, Kadieka, Kado, Kajalawa, Kajamboue, Kangandem, Kao, Katai, Kemini, Kiande, Kolanda, Kolo, Koumande, Kpalanda, Kpayando, Kpayaora, Lakodayo, Lamba, Loukou, Noumbanda, Pampouelou, Payambou, Paywawaya, Peou, Pewa, Soreda, Sorogadanga, Soudore , Soudou, Soulou, Tadoum, Tafdeman, Tamboulado, Taou, Tchambao, Tchonoro, Tchoubona, Tiavaleme, Touazi, Watalangue.

== See also ==
- Alédjo Wildlife Reserve
