= Käo =

Käo may refer to:

== Places in Estonia ==
- Käo, Saare County, village in Laimjala Parish, Saare County
- Käo, Tartu County, village in Rõngu Parish, Tartu County

== People ==
- Henno Käo (1942–2004), Estonian children's writer, book illustrator, poet, and musician
- Jüri Käo (born 1965), Estonian businessman

== See also ==
- Kao (disambiguation)
