= Kado =

Kado may refer to:

- Kadu people
- Ikebana, also known as Kadō, Japanese flower arrangement
- Kado, Kalewa, Burma
- Kado, Togo
- KADO-CD, a low-power television station (channel 36, virtual 40) licensed to serve Shreveport, Louisiana, United States
- Kado or Ka-do, an island in North Korea
- Kado: The Right Answer, anime

== See also ==
- Caddo, a people of southeast US.
