= Fazade =

- Location in Togo
- Coordinates: 9°14′N 1°15′E
- Country: Togo
- Region: Kara Region
- Prefecture: Assoli
- Time zone: UTC + 0

Fazade is a village in the Assoli Prefecture in the Kara Region of north-eastern Togo.
