= Kao =

Kao may refer to:

== Places ==
- Kao, Indonesia, a town
- Kao, Lesotho, a community council
- Kao, Niger, a village and rural commune
- Kao, Togo, a village
- Kao (island), Tonga
- Kao (crater), a lunar crater

== People ==
- Gao (surname), sometimes romanized as Kao, including a list of Chinese people with the surname Kao
- Kao Kim Hourn (born 1966), Cambodian government official and Secretary-General of the Association of Southeast Asian Nations
- R. N. Kao (1918–2002), Indian spymaster, first chief of India's external intelligence agency, the Research and Analysis Wing
- King Kao of Zhou (died 426 BC), 31st king of the Chinese Zhou dynasty
- Kaō (painter), Japanese painter Kaō Ninga (fl. early 14th century)
- Jirayu La-ongmanee (born 1995), Thai actor and singer

== Acronym ==
- Kuiper Airborne Observatory
- Keith-Albee-Orpheum, abbreviated KAO or K-A-O, owners of an American chain of vaudeville and motion picture theatres
- Communist Workers Organisation (Netherlands) (Kommunistische Arbeidersorganisatie)

== Other uses ==
- Huaya, romanized as Kaō, stylized signatures or marks used in East Asian cultures in place of a true signature
- Kaō (era), a Japanese era name
- Kao Corporation, a Japanese chemical and cosmetics company
- Kao language, of Indonesia
- Kao (bull), a divine bull in Meitei mythology
- Kao (film), a 2000 film by Junji Sakamoto
- Kao the Kangaroo, a series of video games
- Kuusamo Airport, Finland, IATA airport code

== See also ==
- Käo (disambiguation)
- Kappa Alpha Theta (ΚΑΘ), a National Panhellenic Conference sorority
