= In the Conservatory (Bartholomé) =

Painting by Albert Bartholomé in the Musée d'Orsay

- In the Greenhouse
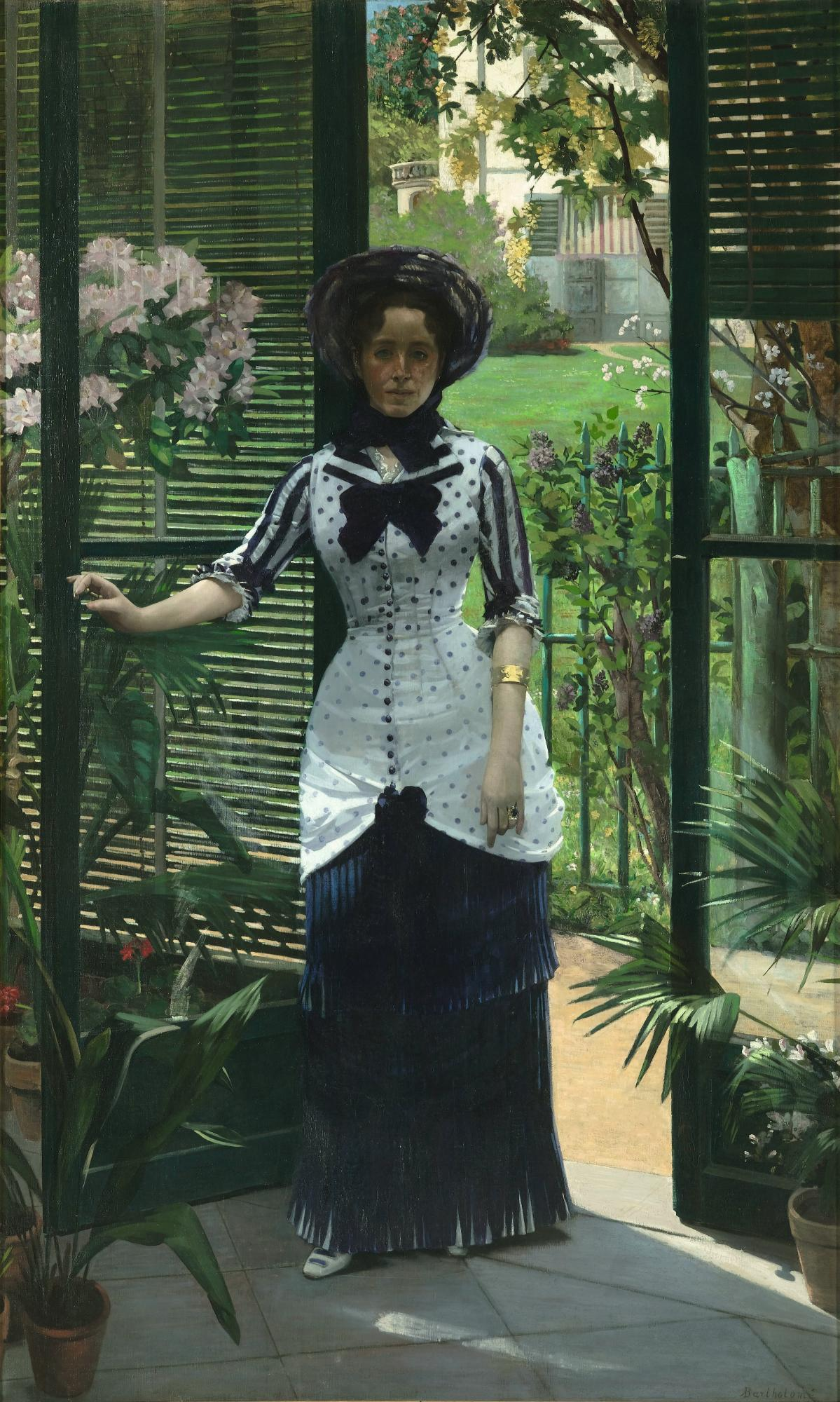
- Artist: Albert Bartholomé
- Year: 1881
- Medium: oil paint, canvas
- Dimensions: 235, 235, 268 cm (93, 93, 106 in) × 145, 145, 176 cm (57, 57, 69 in)
- Location: Musée d'Orsay

In the Conservatory (French: Dans la serre) also known as In the Greenhouse, is an 1881 painting by French artist Albert Bartholomé (1848–1928). It is a full-length portrait of Bartholomé's wife, Prospérie de Fleury, wearing a purple and white dress while standing in the open door of a conservatory. It was exhibited at the Salon of the Société des Artistes Français in 1881. The painting shares elements of Classicism in the style of ceremonial portraits, Realism in the style of Jules Bastien-Lepage (1848–1884), and Impressionism in the style of Gustave Caillebotte (1848–1894).

Prospérie died in 1887, devastating the artist. Edgar Degas (1834–1917) was good friends with the couple and convinced Bartholomé to become a sculptor to deal with his sadness, beginning with the creation of a monument for his wife's grave. Bartholomé switched permanently to sculpture and never painted again after 1886. After her death, he saved the dress Prospérie wore in the painting. The Charles and André Bailly gallery preserved the dress and donated it to the Musée d’Orsay in 1991. The painting is sometimes exhibited along with the dress, and they both toured the world in 2013 as part of the "Impressionism, Fashion and Modernity" exhibition.

== Related works ==
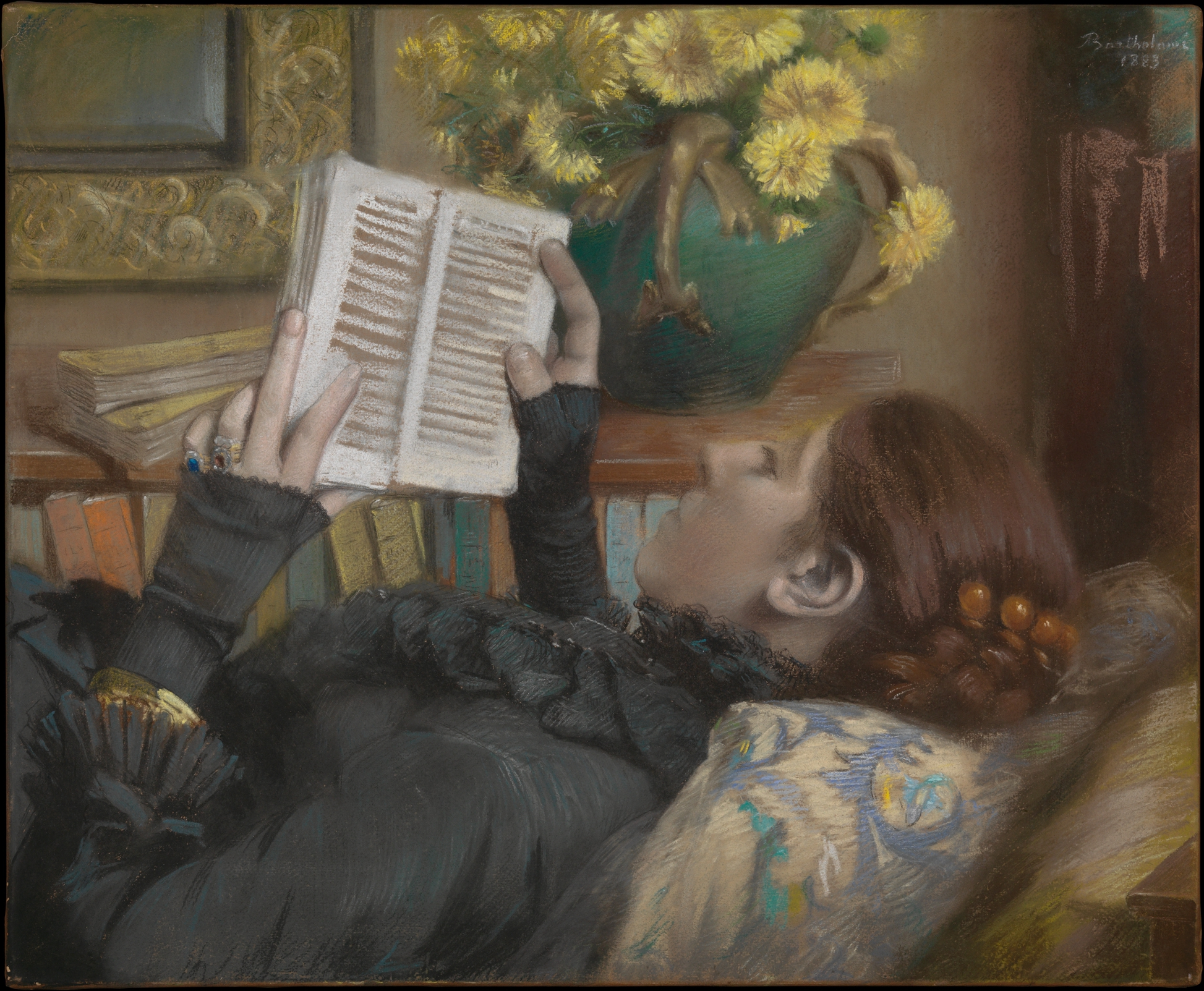
The Artist’s Wife (1883). Prospérie reading.

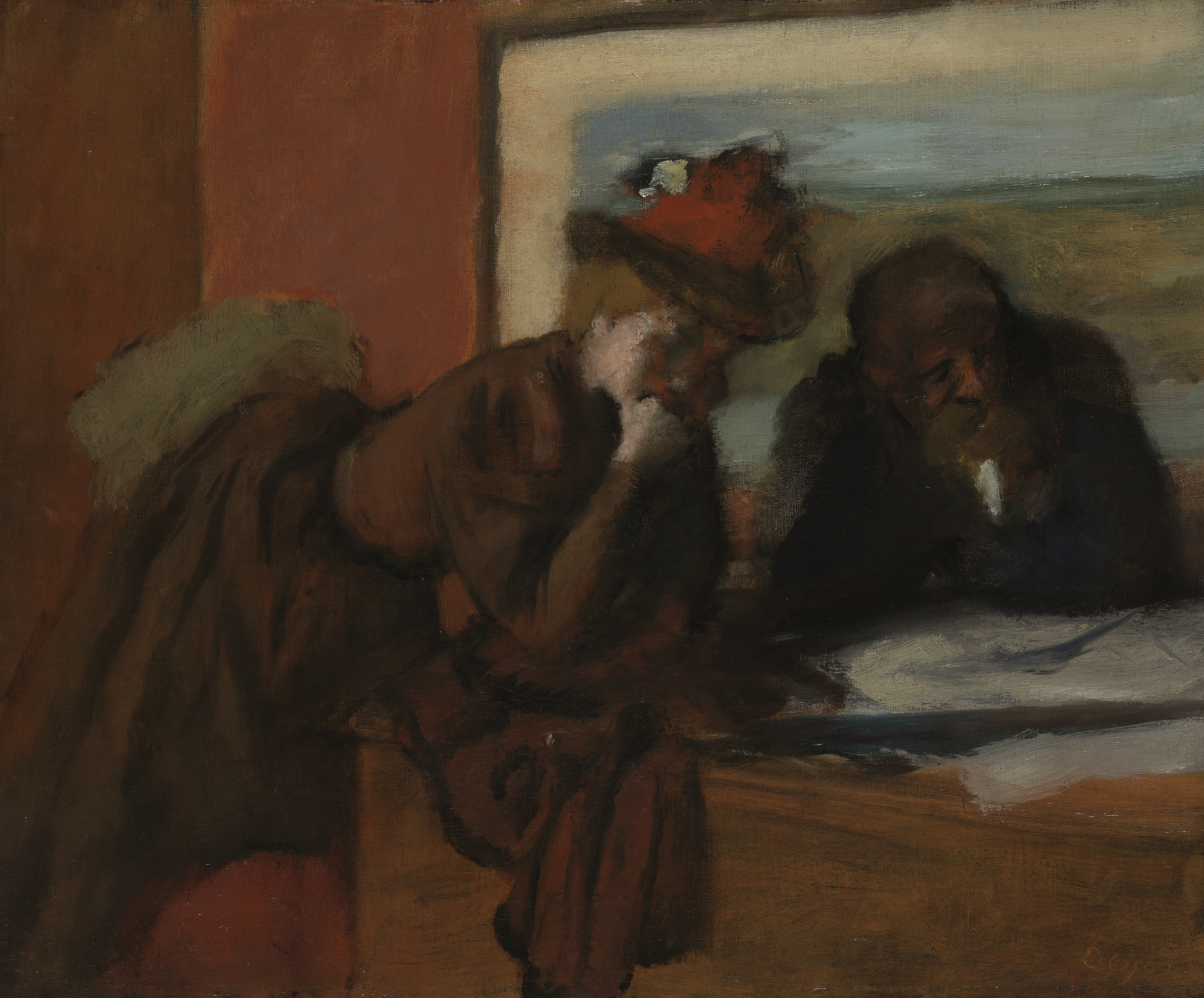
The Conversation (1885) by Edgar Degas. Prospérie on the left.

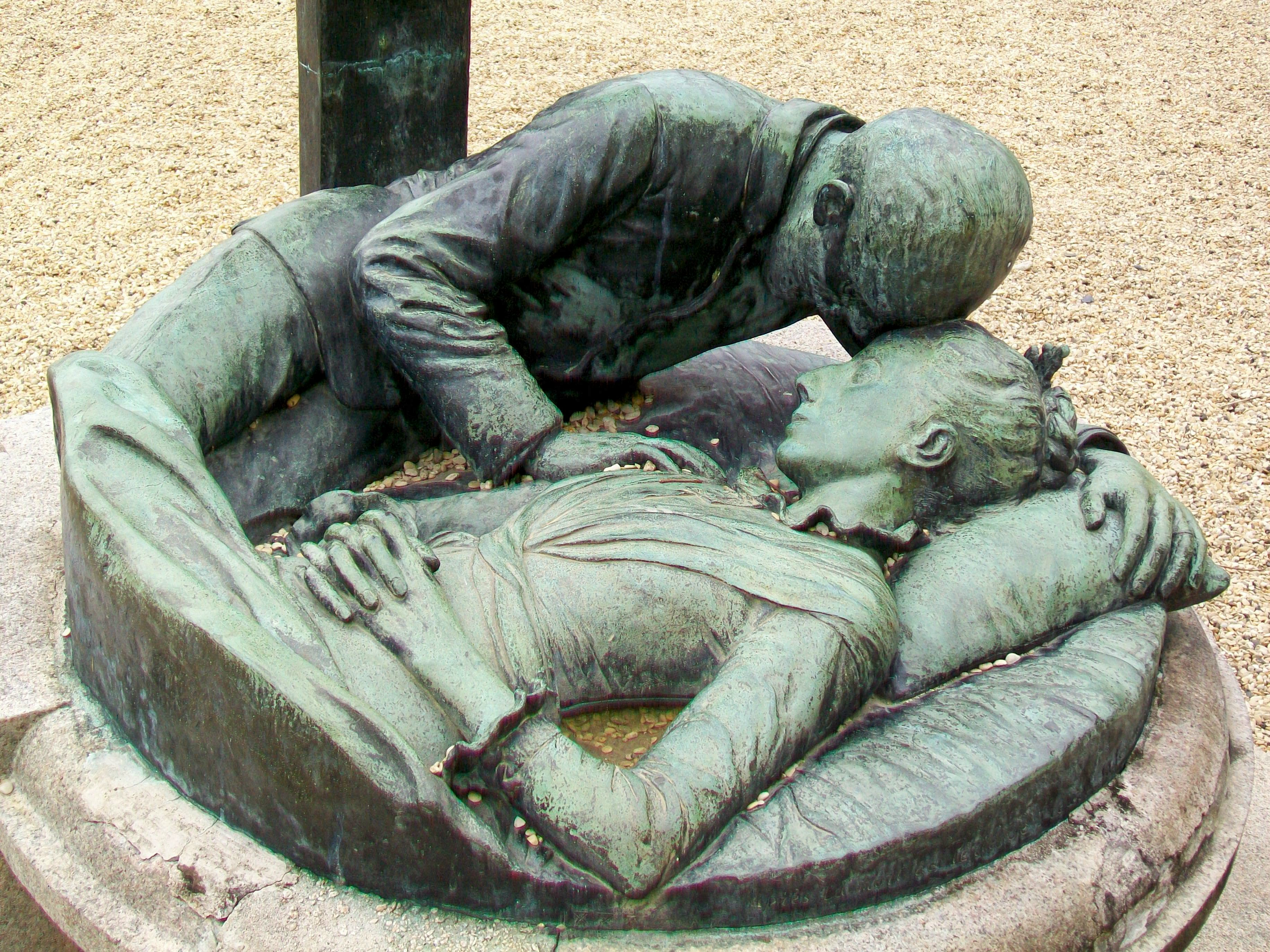
Prospérie's grave sculpted by Bartholomé
