= Kolo, Togo =

- Location in Togo
- Coordinates: 9°22′N 1°19′E
- Country: Togo
- Region: Kachin State
- Prefecture: Assoli
- Time zone: UTC + 0

Kolo, Togo is a village in the Assoli Prefecture in the Kara Region of north-eastern Togo.
