= Katai, India =

Katai
- Census town
- Location in Maharashtra, India
- Coordinates: 19.3078°N 73.0424°E
- Country: India
- State: Maharashtra
- District: Thane

Population (2001)
  - Total: 11,250

Languages
  - Official: Marathi
- Time zone: UTC+5:30 (IST)

Katai is a census town in Thane district in the Indian state of Maharashtra.

== Demographics ==
As of 2001 India census, Katai had a population of 11,250. Males constitute 74% of the population and females 26%. Katai has an average literacy rate of 67%, higher than the national average of 59.5%: male literacy is 74%, and female literacy is 45%. In Katai, 11% of the population is under 6 years of age.
