= Terra (video game) =

Terra: Battle For The Outlands
- Developers: Originally Kaon Interactive, then Jacked-In, currently: TerraOutlands
- Platform: Microsoft Windows
- Release: Beta 1 1996
- Genre: Shooting MMOG
- Mode: Multiplayer

Terra (also known as Terra: 2120 or Terra: Battle for the Outland) was one of the internet's original massively multiplayer online role-playing games (MMORPGs), debuting in early 1996 from Kaon Interactive. Kaon dropped development of the game within a few years and it has since been taken over and kept running by its loyal fan base. Other than minor updates to run on the newer Windows platforms, the game is still in its original retro format and is free to play.

== Overview ==
Terra is a virtual world played from the first-person perspective with one of several vehicles, originally limited to a medium tank (Rhino), light scout vehicle (Goat), or a heavy long-range self-propelled howitzer (Buffalo). A light attack helicopter (Shrike) was added sometime in 1997 and several other vehicle types have been added since, including a heavy tank (Armadillo) and fast laser-armed recon vehicles both land (Scarab) and air (Phoenix). Also, stationary fort defenses which existed from the start of the game (Thugs) as AI's have been made player-usable.

The game has some role-playing aspects to it as each player makes a character whose statistics are tracked continuously. Each player aligns themselves with a clan, and all players start in one of two clans called the "Desert Rats" or "AMOK". Players move from these two beginner/introductory clans by either pledging to existing primary clans or by forming their own clans.

== Ranks ==
Players are given rank status for the kill ratios they have attained. Higher rank means more privileges, although some of that is controlled by the clan leader for clan security reasons. Higher rank also allows the ability to create one's own clan, build forts and associated defences. Ranks go from Recruit at 0 kills, Trooper at 10 kills, Lance Corporal at 20 kills, Corporal at 50 kills, Sergeant at 100 kills (can withdraw money), Sergeant 1st Class at 150 kills (can build fuel and ammo dumps (depots)), Second Lieutenant at 200 kills (can build defenses), First Lieutenant at 250 kills (can form alliances), Captain at 300 kills (can build forts (castles), mobilebases, and powerplants), to Major at 500 kills. At Major, players can form their own clan, transfer bases, and designate a base as the clan's "home fort." After the rank of Major, the ranks go from Lt. Colonel at 150 kills, all the way up to Emperor at 500,000 kills.

== Construction ==
=== Forts ===
Castles, or "forts", are the main bases that are built in the Outlands. These structures are stronger than Mobile Bases. Castles require power to operate and no vehicles can be purchased until the Castle is powered. Power can be obtained from either a Power plant setup at the Castle or from another Castle's Power plant, as long as that Castle is within 12 km. This will link the two forts onto the same power grid and allow near instantaneous travel between the two Castles. Each castle has 4 control pylons and can have a maximum of 20 stationary ground defences including the Power Plant and Radars. In addition to the 20 stationary ground defences, a clan can purchase up to 7 robot defenders.

=== Mobile bases ===
Mobile bases, or "MB's", are secondary bases, and are most often used for attacking enemy Castles or doing recon in the area. Although not as strong as Castles, they are cheaper and finish building faster. Mobile bases also have an internal power source so they do not require a power plant although they can still be linked to a powered fort if within 12 km. Mobile bases only have 2 control pylons, a maximum of 16 stationary ground defences and they cannot have any robot defenders.

=== Defenses ===
There are two main types of stationary ground defences available for construction at Castles and Mobile bases, either of which can be built at a maximum distance of 3 km from an allied asset. Repulsors or "Reps" are used to keep opposing clans away from an assets control pylons. Repulsors can link to powered structures, (Castles and Mobile bases) power plants, and other repulsors within 500 meters. When connected to another repulsor, an invisible wall is formed between them and if any enemy vehicles try to cross it, they will be repulsed back roughly 400 meters. It is general practise to have at least 6 repulsors in a pattern so that they are connected and cover the pylons, this is called a "Rep Field". The other type of ground defence available for construction is the thug. Thugs are capable of returning fire at the enemy. Thugs are used to defend the repulsors and to help players locate and eliminate attacking enemies. Generally, thugs are left unmanned and will fire with basic weapons. If a player wishes, they may jump into the thug and take advantage of the strong armor and high ammo count. If unmanned, thugs tend to fire LDM in bursts of three at targets beyond 600 meters and fire DUP rounds at targets closer than 600 meters with increasing speed as the target approaches the thug.

The third type of ground defence are decoy pylons. Decoy pylons look and act just like regular pylons only once they get shot, they explode. Since a player has to be within 100 meters to kill a pylon, it makes them dangerous because the player that kills it has to be next to it when it explodes. Players can also build Radars at their assets.

=== Support Structures ===
There are two types of structures that can be built without any nearby asset, they are the Ammo Dump and the Fuel Dump. These can be built anywhere as long as they are further than 1.2 km from an asset. The Ammo Dump, or AD, replenishes all ammo to maximum loadout in any vehicle(VIN) and restores full armor. The process takes around 30 seconds and a player is entirely vulnerable during that time, including from an opponent killing the AD itself. AD's explode(die) with large damage inflicted within 100 meters.

Fuel Dumps are single purpose, refueling a VIN. When killed they also can do serious damage to any player or AI nearby.

== Reception ==
The Tampa Tribune rated it three stars, stating "the tanks are easily controlled and a lot of fun to drive, but the battles sometimes become frustrating". Andrew Rodgers of the Chicago Tribune commented that the game's fans will "call it a madly addictive tank game" where the ultimate "point is to make money by killing other players and taking over enemy forts". The Daily American stated that "Terra takes online gaming to new heights on many levels" – the article highlights the game's "unbelievably smooth graphics, a painless point-and-go tank control interface and countless other unique design feature" along with the inclusion of "social and financial elements" which make Terra "part virtual community, part cyberspace gladiator arena".

The Daily American commented that "money and weaponry are amassed by conquest" and that "the action is nonstop" since the game continues on after players log off and has players across "nearly every time zone". Rodgers noted that Terra has an in-game community with in-game communication which is part of "what sets this game apart" and for advanced players, "there are lots of politics and strategies that make the game fun"; however, Terra also "has a very steep learning curve". He highlighted that player formed clans include a hierarchy so people with authority issues "won't like this game". Michael Saunders of The Boston Globe commented "mini-societies have evolved in the form of fighting teams" and that "another cool feature" of Terra are bots which can be programed "to guard forts or to carry out simple tasks". Saunders stated that Terra does not have much of a problem with lag "because tank movements are inherently ponderous and deliberate" and the game utilizes Kaon Interactive's "proprietary technology that reduces the effects of ping differences between players". Saunders highlighted its minimalist graphics with "high polygon forms that are ugly and boring but easy to render" and that unlike multiplayer shooting games, "players are not required to make many rapid movements".
