= Koumondè =

- Location in Togo
- Coordinates: 9°23′N 1°19′E
- Country: Togo
- Region: Kachin State
- Prefecture: Assoli
- Time zone: UTC + 0

Koumondè or Koumande is a canton and village in the Assoli Prefecture in the Kara Region of north-eastern Togo.
