= Kado, Togo =

Kado
- Location in Togo
- Coordinates: 9°18′N 1°25′E
- Country: Togo
- Region: Kara Region
- Prefecture: Assoli
- Time zone: UTC + 0

Kado, Togo is a village in the Assoli Prefecture in the Kara Region of north-eastern Togo.
