= War memorials (Aisne) =

The War Memorials of Aisne or Monuments aux Morts of Aisne are French war memorials in the Aisne, in the region of Picardy, commemorating those men of the Aisne region who died in World War I

== Background ==
This region saw considerable action throughout World War I. In 1914, the Allied armies retreated through the region before the advancing German armies, who were following Von Schlieffen's plan of attack. At the Battle of the Marne, the German army's advance was halted and they retreated to the Aisne region and then dug in there before the so-called "race to the sea". The "war of movement" was to be short-lived and replaced by a static war of attrition, dominated by the trenches. The region was thereafter an integral part of the Western Front, the "Chemin des Dames" area, in particular, seeing the French army in continual action. This article deals with the local memorials which were erected in every city, town and village in France.

== Some of the monument aux morts in the Aisne region ==
Work	Image	Location	Date(s)	Subject, notes and references
The monument aux morts at Achery.		Achery	1925	The Achery war memorial features work by the sculptor N. Staquet. The inauguration took place on 29 July 1923. The same statue, which features a French infantryman or "poilu" can be seen at Versigny, this war memorial being inaugurated on 12 July 1925.
The monument aux morts at Acy		Acy	1924	The Acy war memorial entitled L'Ange de l'Apocalypse is one of the sculptor Henri Charlier's works and was completed in 1924. It stands in front of the parish church. Also in Acy, and on the Plateau d’Acy is the Pleureuse d’Acy, another Charlier work, this remembering the dead of the 1939–1945 war.
The monument aux morts at Braine		Braine	1922	The war memorial at Braine was inaugurated on 10 December 1922 and features a bronze allegory of France by the sculptor Charles Breton. Breton had worked on the war memorials of Saint-Mandé and Fontenay-sous-Bois in Val-de-Marne and that at Saint-Alban-sur-Limagnole in Lozère. The Braine bronze memorial was produced by the foundry Leblanc-Barbedier et Fils.
The monument aux morts at Bucy-lès-Pierrepont		Bucy-lès-Pierrepont	1922	The Bucy-lès-Pierrepont memorial features a work by the sculptor Charles-Henri Pourquet. Cast by the foundry Val d'Osne, the work was given the title Poilu No.853. It featured in the Val d'Osne catalogue, proved to be popular, and can be seen on war memorials throughout France. ThIs monument was inaugurated on 23 July 1922.
The Monument aux morts at Chateau-Thierry		Château-Thierry		The composition here is most dramatic and the sculptor Achille Jacopin has produced a sculpture depicting a dead soldier lying flat on the ground.
The monument aux morts at Chauny		Chauny	1930	Émile Pinchon was the sculptor of the war memorial at Chauny with inauguration taking place on 6 July 1930. A maquette of this work is kept at the Historial de la Grande Guerre at Péronne. The Amiens born Pinchon's composition features three women. The central figure represents "La Republique" with "Douleur" on one side and "Jeunesse" on the other.
The monument aux morts at Chavignon		Chavignon	1933	Chavignon's war memorial involves sculptural work by Henri Albert Lagriffoul. There are two bas-reliefs on the monument, one depicting a soldier holding an antique sword and the other a woman carrying her child and a sheaf of wheat. The monument also remembers the action of the 4th Regiment of the French Army and those who fell in the action to expel the Germans from Chavignon on 23 October 1917. This monument was inaugurated on 1 October 1933.
The monument aux morts at Danizy.		Danizy	1923	At Danizy the war memorial features work by N. Staquet; a depiction of a standing soldier. It was inaugurated on 15 August 1923.
The monument aux morts at Essigny-le-Petit		Essigny-le-Petit		At the commune of Essigny-le-Petit is an Établissements H. Jacomet edition by the sculptor Étienne Camus. In bronzed cast iron it is called Poilu baïonnette au canon and is a well-known piece in France, as is Jacomet's Poilu au repos, another work by Camus. Jacomet's works are found in the Somme and Oise regions.
The monument aux morts at Fargniers		Fargniers	1926	In the commune of Fargniers east of Tergnier, the war memorial features a work by Paul Landowski whose work we encountered at Ault in the Somme. Fargniers suffered much destruction in the Great War and like many other communes was awarded the Croix de Guerre in recognition of her sufferings. This monument was inaugurated on 11 November 1926.
The monuments aux morts at Foreste		Foreste	1924	The war memorial at Foreste features sculptural work by Raoul Josset. Josset had worked as an interpreter for the US troops during the Great War. The Foreste memorial was inaugurated in 1924. After the war Josset emigrated to the US and lived in Texas, where he completed several public works.
The monument aux morts at Guignicourt.	Guignicourt	Guignicourt	1924	The war memorial at Guignicourt was inaugurated on 20 September 1924. The sculptor is unknown. The composition shows a couple, bent before some graves, perhaps including that of their son. The woman carries a bouquet of roses and is supported by her husband.
The monument aux morts at Guise.	The war memorial at Guise	Guise		The Guise war memorial features a work by sculptor André Joseph Allar. Allar depicts a woman, meant to represent Guise, who comforts a child. Guise was where Jean-Baptiste Godin, the humanist and philanthropist, built his factory which was intended as an example of how the working classes should be treated. Alongside the factory, Godin had built all the amenities which he considered the workers should have; housing, laundry facilities, a school, a theatre, gardens, a swimming pool, etc. In the grounds are a monument which remembers those Familistere men who lost their lives in the Great War, the Monument aux morts du Familistère de Guise, sculpted by the brothers Jan et Joël Martel (1896–1966). These brothers were well known as avant-garde and cubist sculptors. Guise was also the scene of a fierce battle in 1914 when the 5th French Army, retreating before the advancing German armies, stopped their retreat and engaged with the enemy. The 5th Army was commanded by General Lanrezac and the Martel brothers were sculptors of the monument which marks this battle. Several photographs of the "Lanrezac monument" are shown below as are photographs of the Familistere monument aux morts.

== Images of Guise ==
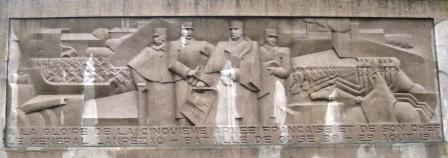
The 5th Army monument at Guise

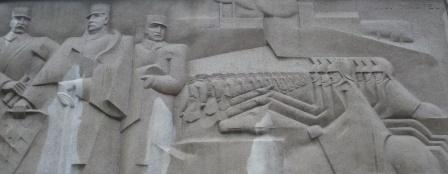
Detail from the 5th Army monument at Guise

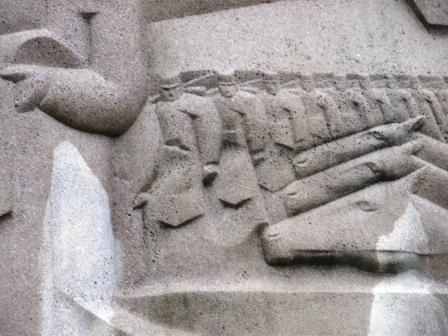
Detail from the 5th Army monument at Guise

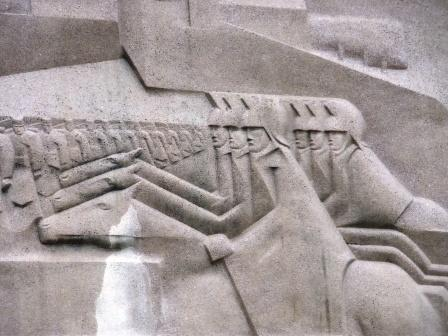
Detail from the 5th Army monument at Guise

Work	Image	Location	Date(s)	Subject, notes and references
The monument aux morts at Holnon.	The war memorial of Holnon	Holnon	1926	The Holnon war memorial features a work in bronze by the sculptor Grégoire Calvet. The monument was inaugurated on 30 May 1926.
The monument aux morts at Jaulgonne		Jaulgonne	1921	At the village of Jaulgonne near Château-Thierry the war memorial has sculptural work by Louis Bertrand. The monument was inaugurated on 9 October 1921.
The monument aux morts at Laon.		Laon	1926	At Laon, the capital of the Aisne region, the war memorial features sculptural work by Marcel Gaumont.
The monument aux morts at Mézières-sur-Oise		Mézières-sur-Oise	1923	The war memorial in Mézières-sur-Oise features a bronzed cast-iron work by the Durenne foundry which was inaugurated on 10 June 1923. The authorship of the relief is not known and the same relief can be seen at Becquigny. In the parish church in Mézières-sur-Oise there is a war memorial by Charles Desvergnes (1860–1928) called Ange de la reconnaissance couronnant un soldat.
Montaigu		Montaigu	1926	The Montaigu monument aux morts has sculptural work by Eugene Durassier and was inaugurated 20 May 1928.
The monument aux morts at Origny-Sainte-Benoite		Origny-Sainte-Benoite		Marius-Léon Cladel, who created a monument in Appilly in the Oise, was the creator of the Origny-Sainte-Benoite war memorial.
The monument aux morts at Pontavert		Pontavert	1926	At the commune of Pontavert there is a war memorial with a relief by Norbert Gaillard. The monument dates from 1926 and was inaugurated on 3 October 1926. The relief features a helmeted victor in profile whose right hand shows a winged figure holding in the left hand a crown of laurels. A gallic cock to the rear is accompanied by the word "PAX", the Latin word for peace.
The monument aux morts at Saint-Quentin	A view of the war memorial	Saint-Quentin	1927	Saint Quentin, one of the major cities of the Aisne region, suffered major damage during the Great War. The war memorial, designed by the Prix de Rome winning architect Paul Bigot, has bas-reliefs by Henri Bouchard and Paul Landowski. The Saint-Quentin monument aux morts was unveiled on 31 July 1927 in the presence of General Debeney. Bigot built a 31 metre long monument which consisted of nine columns supporting one huge pediment and on these columns are inscribed the names of those who died in the Great War, whether as soldiers or civilians killed during the German occupation. On the pediment itself are three bas-reliefs. That at the centre shows life in the trenches and scenes from the civilian exodus of March 1917 and at each end are bas-reliefs, one depicting a scene from 1870 and the other remembering the conflict of 1557. The wording on the monument was subsequently changed to remember those who had lain down their lives in the 1939–1945 conflict.

== Images Saint-Quentin ==
Work	Image	Location	Date(s)	Subject, notes and references
German military cemetery				In a German military cemetery near Saint-Quentin which holds the graves of 8,229 soldiers, there is a monument erected in memory of the soldiers from both sides of the war - "morts pour leur patrie" (note the use of the word "leur"). The sculptor Wilhelm Wandschneider created an imitation Greek temple with four Doric columns. On the rear wall is a sculpture with the inscription "Requiescant in pace mortui hic pro patria 1914–1918". On two pedestal are bronze statues representing two warriors and the year 1915.
Soissons	The statue on the northwest side depicting a "citizen" holding a scroll	Soissons		At Soissons, the war memorial has statues by Albert Bartholomé and a series of bas-reliefs by sculptor and medallist Raoul Lamourdedieu. It was as late as 21 July 1935 that Soissons finally saws her monument aux morts unveiled by the President, Albert Lebrun. The Soissons monument had first been designed by Bartholome in 1914 as a monument to celebrate the history of Soissons but it was decided to create the memorial as the City's monument aux morts and it was erected in 1926. However the Great War veterans ("Les Anciens Combattants") were unhappy with Bartholome's statue of a woman at the very top of the monument, the so-called "Dame Blanche", and after much discussion the "Dame Blanche" was moved to a position in the St Crepin park and eventually replaced on the top of the monument aux morts by the four men carrying an "eternal flame" which was completed by a pupil of Lamourdedieu. The monument comprises a central pedestal with the "eternal flame" at the very top and Lamourdedieu's reliefs are on the sides of the pedestal. At each corner of the monument are Bartholome statues. In the middle section of the pedestal there are bas-reliefs on the south and east facing sides. In one Lamourdedieu depicts a group of soldiers and in the other a winged female figure representing "Victory" protects another two soldiers, one of whom is wounded. On the west facing side of the lower part of the pedestal the bas-relief depicts the King of France and Joan of Arc entering Soissons on horseback on 23 June 1429 and on the south facing side the bas-relief depicts the story of the "Vase of Soissons". A soldier is seen crushing the vase under the eyes of Clovis and the messengers of St Remigius. The north facing bas-relief shows the evacuation of the City. The statue on the north west side depicted a "citizen" holding a scroll. The inscription reads "1181. Abolition des Servitudes Feodales a Soissons" In the south west corner is a knight carrying a sword. The inscription tells his story "923. Carolingien defenseur de Soissons. Capital Franque" The south east and north east facing corners have statues depicting French soldiers of the Great War.

== Images for Soissons ==
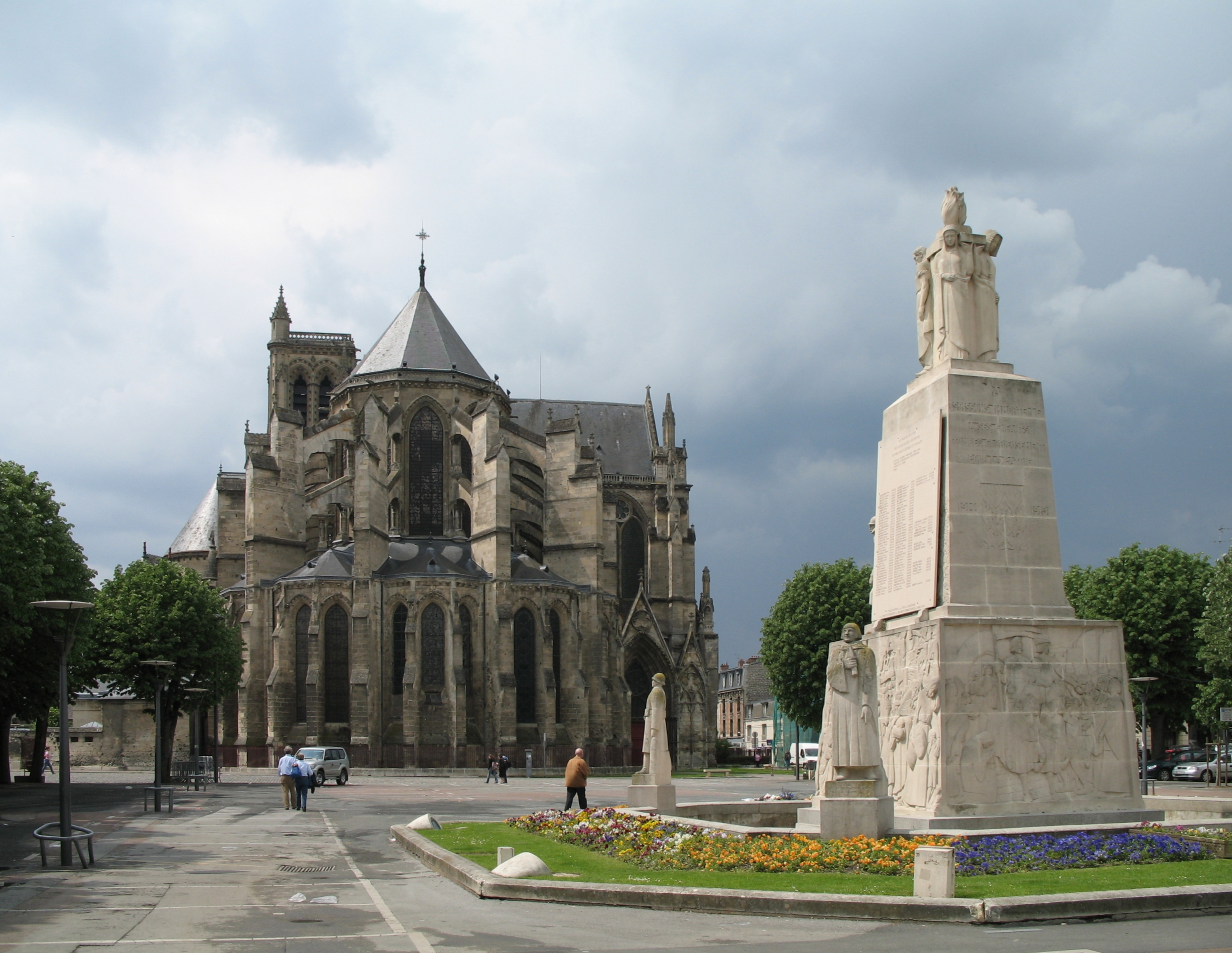
The Soissons War Memorial

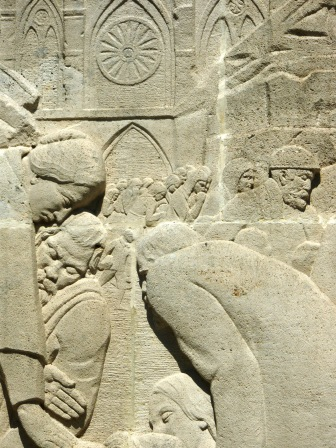
Part of one of the bas-reliefs on the Soissons monument aux mort

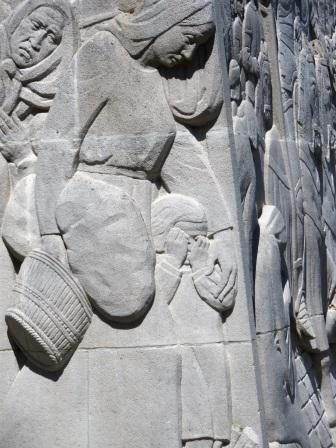
Part of one of the bas-reliefs on the Soissons war memorial

In Soisssons is a monument by Jan et Joël Martel, erected in 1925 to commemorate the activities of the "coopératives dans la reconstruction des régions sinistrées après la première guerre mondiale" (English: cooperatives in the reconstruction of disaster areas after the First World War) and the rôle played by Guy de Lubersac the président of the confédération générale des coopératives, the fédération départementale des unions de coopératives de reconstruction de l' Aisne and of the union soissonnaise des coopératives de reconstitution.

Nearby is the English sculptor Eric Kennington's "Monument to the Missing" which is dedicated to all those who lost their lives in this area but do not have known graves (their bodies were never found/identified). During the Battles of the Aisne and the Marne in 1918 there were nearly 4,000 Allied soldiers lost.

== Eric Kennington's "Monument to the Missing" ==
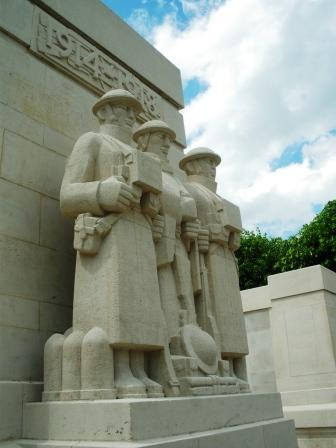
The "Monument to the Missing" in Soissons by Eric Kennington.

Work	Image	Location	Date(s)	Subject, notes and references
The monument aux morts at Tergnier		Tergnier	1925	The Tergnier war memorial uses a model called Victory, which was marketed by Marbreries Générales Gourdon. This monument was inaugurated on 26 April 1925.
The monument aux morts at Vervins		Vervins	1922	In the place du Palais, Vervins the monument aux mort consists of an obelisk and a sculpture of a young woman paying homage to the bust of a helmeted poilu. The poilu has a croix de guerre pinned to his chest and the young woman holds a laurel leaf, both in bronze. The sculptural work was by Joseph Shany Gauthier and dates from 1922.
The monument aux morts at Vailly-sur-Aisne			1927	The monument aux morts was inaugurated 24 July 1927. The sculptor is thought to be Antoine Sartorio.
Villers-Cotterêts		Villers-Cotterêts	1923	At Villers-Cotterêts is a war memorial by sculptors Louis Dejean and Henry Arnold. The monument features a standing woman who is an allegory for the forest of Retz and on each side of her are seated soldiers.

== See also ==
- World War I memorials
- War memorials (Oise)
- War memorials (Eastern Somme)
- War memorials (Western Somme)
