= Henri Lagriffoul =

French sculptor (1907–1981)

Henri-Albert Lagriffoul
- Born: 9 May 1907; Paris, France
- Died: 22 August 1981 (aged 74)
- Occupation: Sculptor
- Known for: "Marianne" on French coins

Henri-Albert Lagriffoul (9 May 1907 – 22 August 1981) was a French sculptor who won the Prix de Rome in 1932. His work is displayed in many public spaces in France. His head of "Marianne" appeared on the French coins from 1962 to 1970. He also competed in the art competitions at the 1948 Summer Olympics.

== Background ==
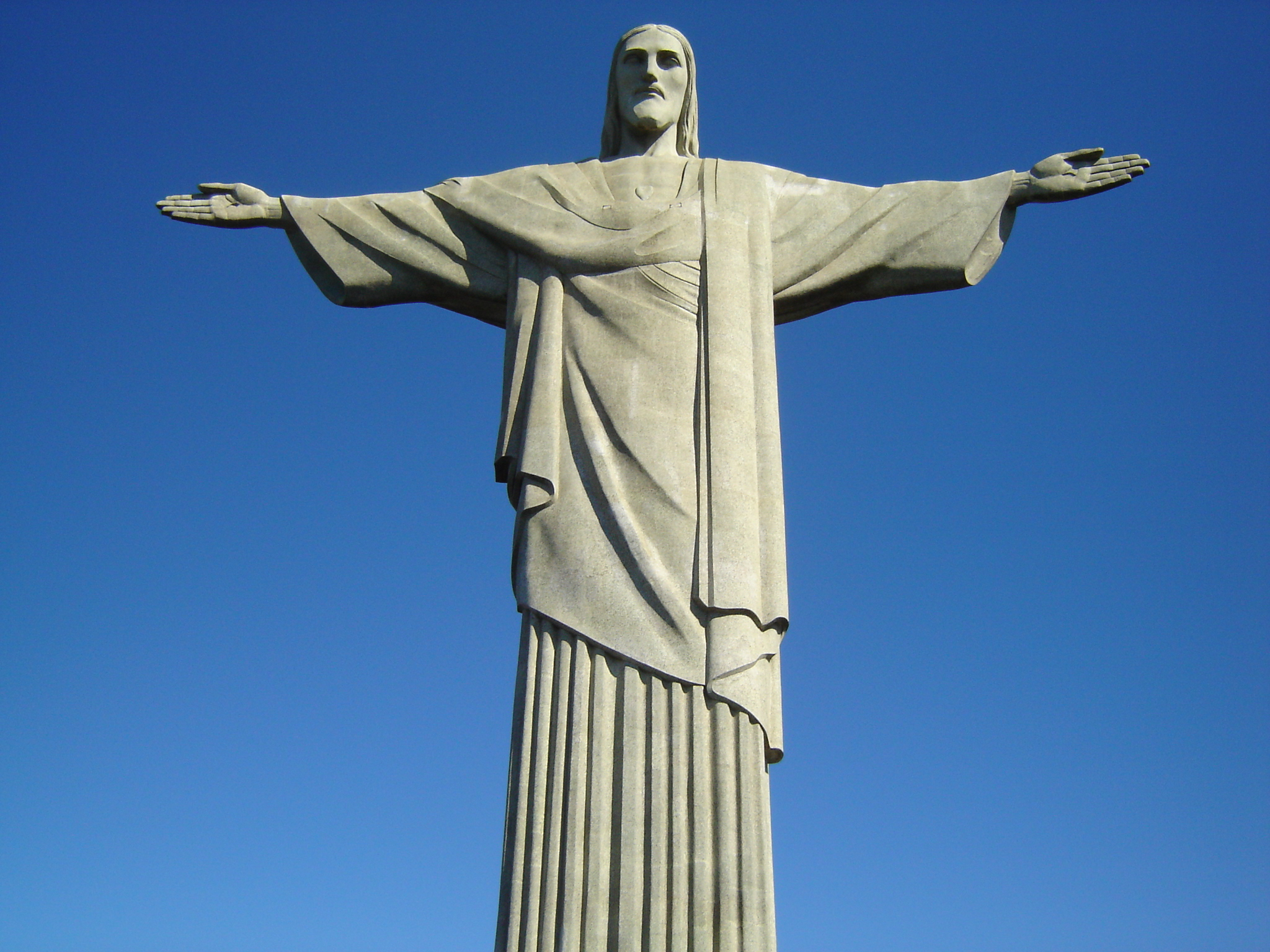
Lagriffoul assisted Paul Landowski with the statue of Christ the Redeemer at Corcovado in Rio.

Lagriffoul was born in Paris in 1907. His father ran a goldsmith workshop. He was admitted to the studio of sculptors Jules Coutan and Paul Landowski at the École nationale supérieure des Beaux-Arts in Paris from 1924 to 1925. Lagriffoul assisted Landowski with the statue of Christ the Redeemer at Corcovado, Rio de Janeiro, Brazil between 1926 and 1931. He won the Prix de Rome for sculpture in 1932 and spent three years at the Villa Médicis in Rome.

Lagriffoul was appointed professor at the École des Beaux-arts, Paris in 1944. He became a member of the advisory council for the Manufacture nationale de Sèvres. He made four sculpture for Sèvres between 1949 and 1955, including a table centerpiece and two ornamented vases. From 1959 he was professor of sculpture at the École polytechnique. He died in 1981.

== Work ==
Chavignon's war memorial has sculptures by Lagriffoul from 1933. There are two bas-reliefs on the monument, one depicting a soldier holding an antique sword and the other a woman carrying her child and a sheaf of wheat. A sculpture by Lagriffoul decorates the north facade of the Collège mixte de Lens, avenue Raoul-Brique, Pas-de-Calais, made in August–September 1958. He created a sculpture representing deportees to concentration and extermination camps for the Mémorial de la France combattante in Mont-Valérien, inaugurated in 1960. It depicts emaciated hands trying to pull away the barbed wire that lacerates a tortured heart. He created the head of "Marianne" that appeared on coins of 5, 10, 20 and 50 centimes from 1962 to 1966.

Some other major works include:

- Badge of the best French worker (1932)
- The Vocation of Joan of Arc, Sainte Jeanne d’Arc Church, Gennevilliers, Hauts-de-Seine (1945)
- Autumn, Présidence du Conseil, Hôtel Montalivet, Paris (1952)
- Virgin and Child, Rouen Cathedral, Seine-Maritime (1956)
- Bas-relief, Chambre of Commerce, Le Havre, Seine-Maritime (1957)
- Monument to the dead of Vimoutiers, Orne (1958)
20 French Centime with Marianne on Obverse.
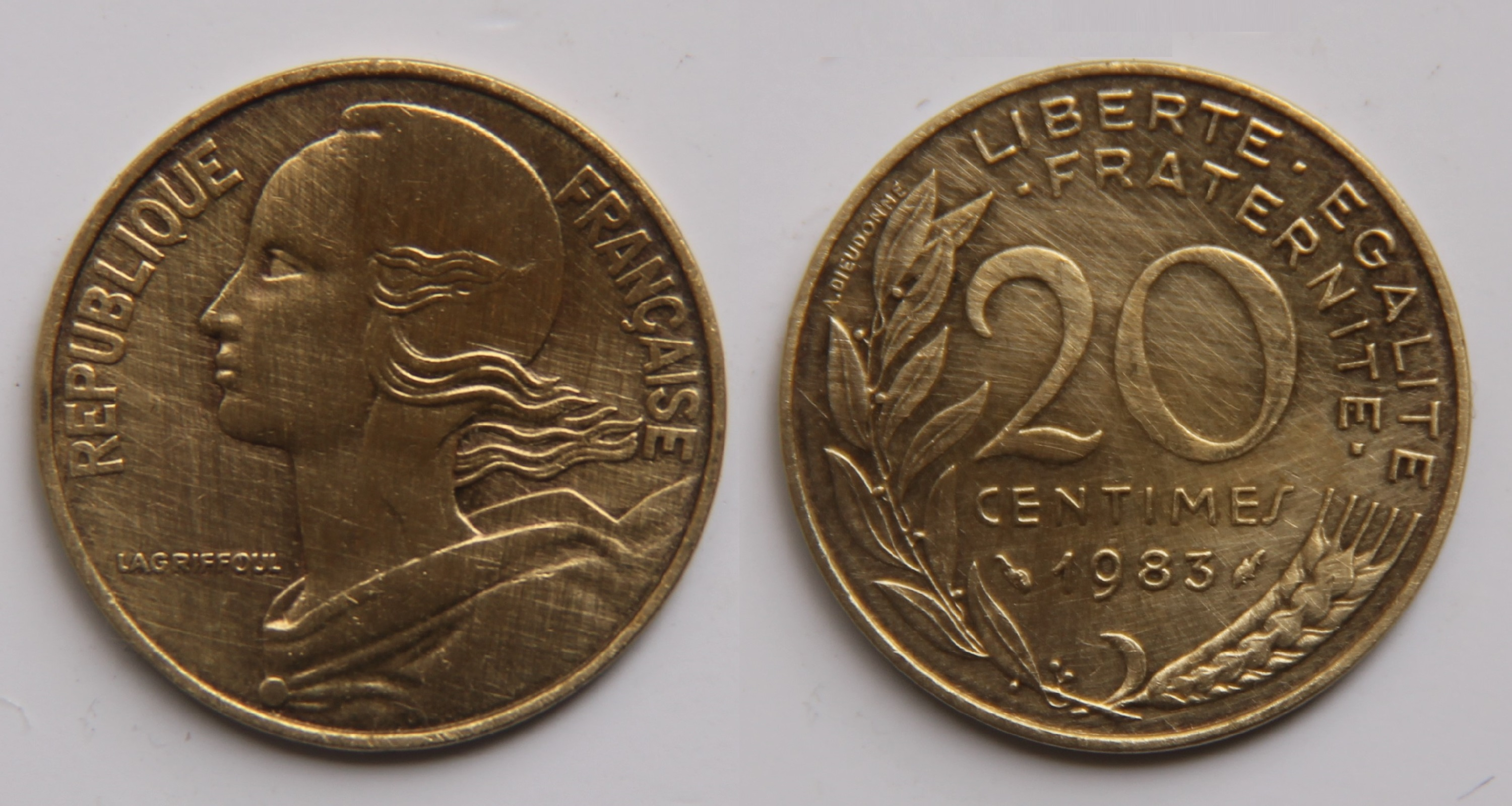
First side of the image: Obverse: Marianne wearing the Phrygian cap of liberty.
Second side of the image: Reverse: Face value and French motto: "Liberté, égalité, fraternité".
Engraved by Chavignon, coin was minted from 1962 to 2001.

== Awards ==
Lagriffoul received the following awards:

- Diplôme d’honneur at the Exposition d’Anvers (Belgium), 1930
- Gold medal at the Exposition coloniale, 1931
- Premier Grand Prix de Rome for sculpture, 1932
- Gold medal at the Exposition Internationale des Arts et Techniques, 1937
- Chevalier de la Légion d’honneur
- Chevalier des Arts et des Lettres

== Publications ==
- Lagriffoul, Henri (1950). Conseils pratiques sur la sculpture. Paris: Editions S. Bornemann.

== Sources ==
- Bruneau, Jocelyne (2010). "Travaux de décoration au titre du 1 % dans les établissements d'enseignement". Conseil général du Pas-de-Calais / Archives départementales.
- "Chavignon, place du Chanoine-Raoul-Debois, Monument aux morts: Description". Région de Picardie. Archived from the original on 2014-11-03.
- "Henri-Albert Lagriffoul ( Paris, 1907 - 1981 )". Sèvres.
- "Lagriffoul Henri" (PDF). Région Basse-Normandie. Archived from the original (PDF) on 2014-11-25.
- "Les seize hauts reliefs". Le Mont-Valérien.
