= Jaulgonne =

- Commune
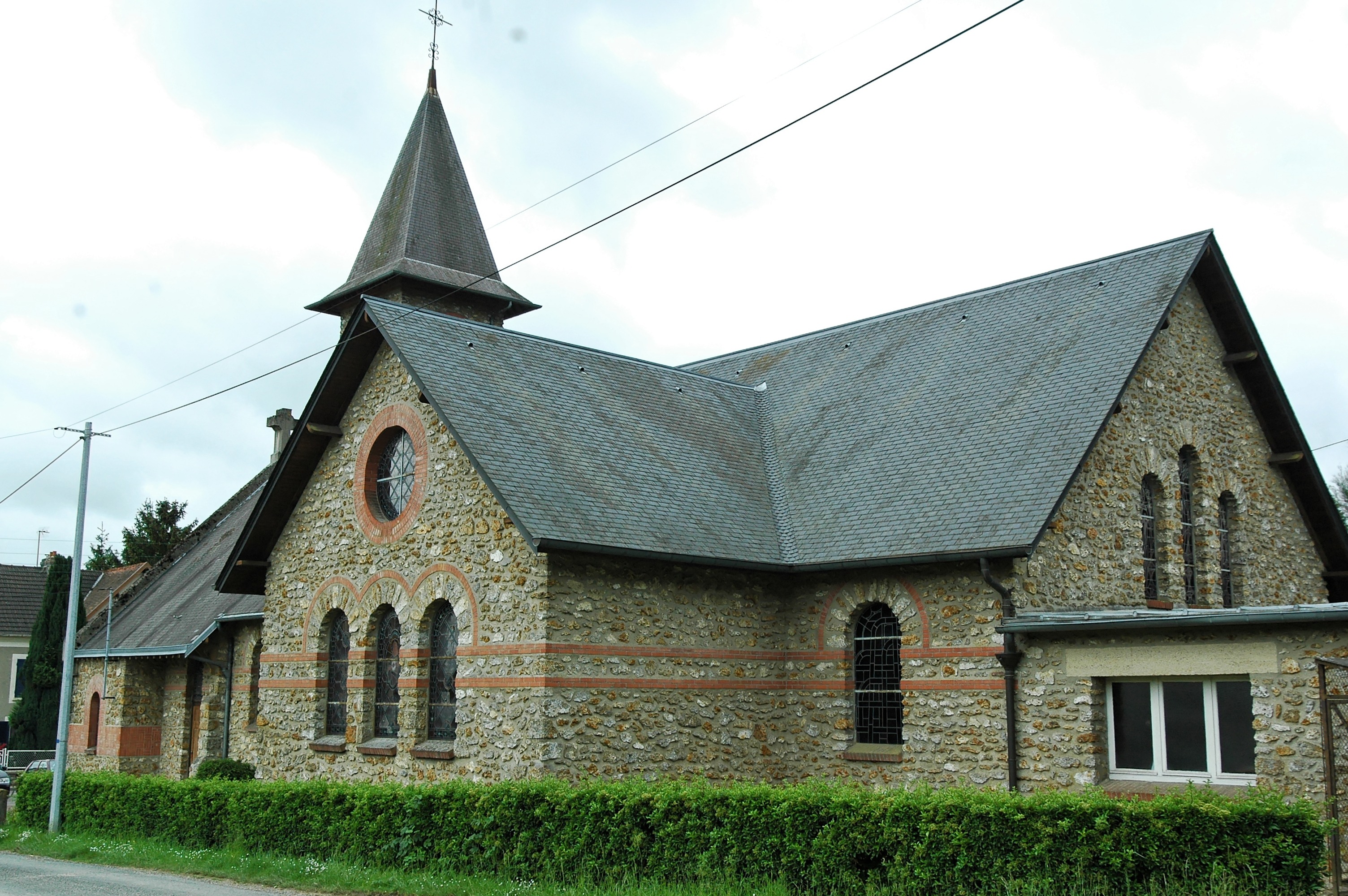
- Church of St John the Baptist, Jaulgonne

- Coat of arms
- Location of Jaulgonne
- Location within France Location within Hauts-de-France
- Coordinates: 49°05′21″N 3°32′03″E
- Country: France
- Region: Hauts-de-France
- Department: Aisne
- Arrondissement: Château-Thierry
- Canton: Essômes-sur-Marne
- Intercommunality: CA Région de Château-Thierry

Government
  - Mayor (2026–32): Anne Maricot
- Area^{1}: 1.78 km^{2} (0.69 sq mi)
- Elevation: 70 m (230 ft)
- Highest elevation: 211 m (692 ft)
- Lowest elevation: 62 m (203 ft)
- Population (2023): 672
  - Density: 378/km^{2} (978/sq mi)
- Time zone: UTC+01:00 (CET)
  - Summer (DST): UTC+02:00 (CEST)
- INSEE/Postal code: 02389 /02850
- ^{1} French Land Register data, which excludes lakes, ponds, glaciers > 1 km^{2} (0.386 sq mi or 247 acres) and river estuaries.

Jaulgonne (French pronunciation: [ʒolɡɔn]) is a commune in the Aisne department and Hauts-de-France region of northern France.

== Population ==
Historical population
Year	Pop.	±% p.a.
1968	560	—
1975	553	−0.18%
1982	559	+0.15%
1990	587	+0.61%
1999	618	+0.57%
2007	644	+0.52%
2012	666	+0.67%
2017	645	−0.64%
2023	672	+0.69%
Source: INSEE

== See also ==
- Communes of the Aisne department
