= Grouches-Luchuel =

- Commune
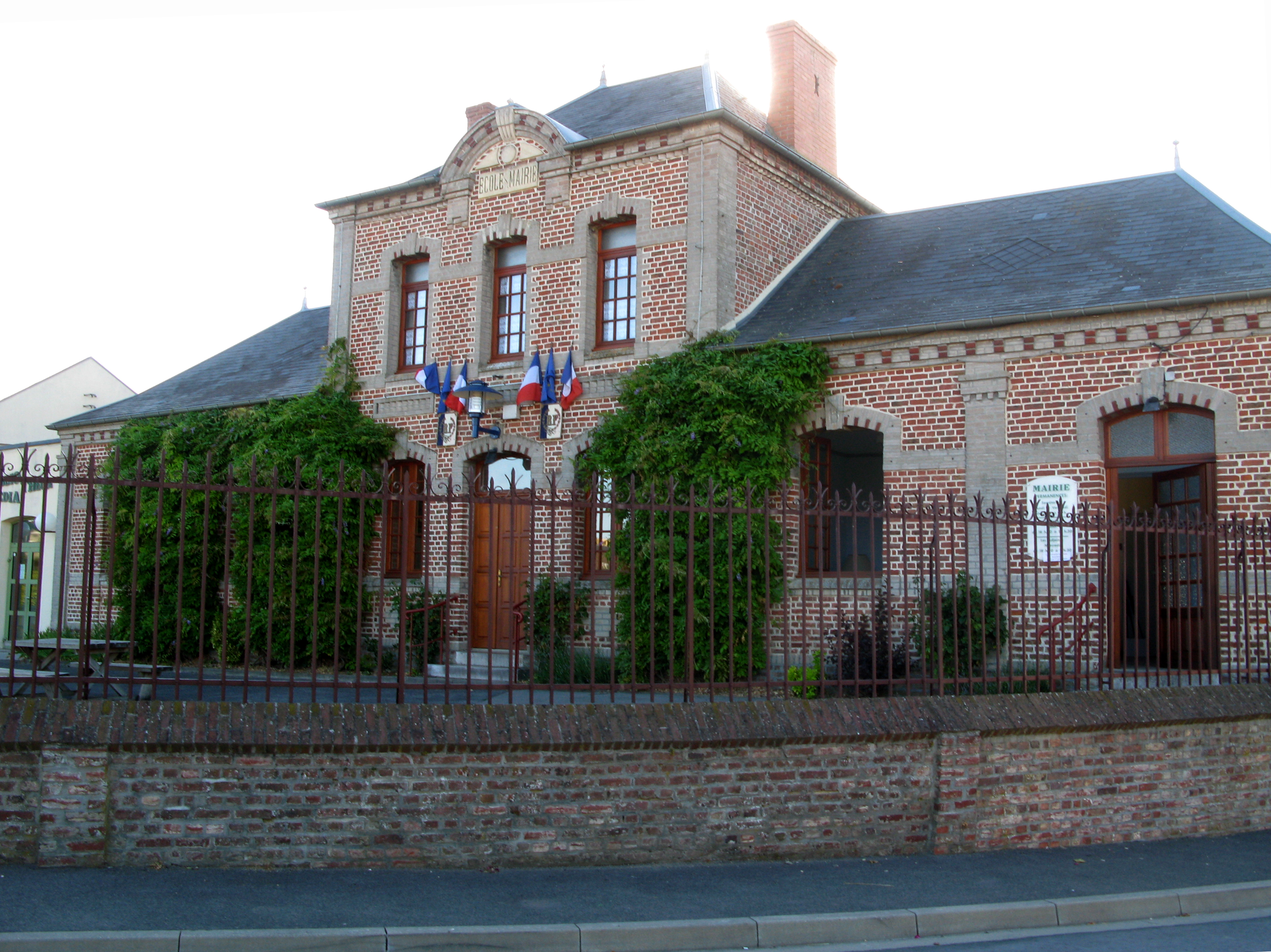
- The town hall in Grouches-Luchuel

- Coat of arms
- Location of Grouches-Luchuel
- Location within France Location within Hauts-de-France
- Coordinates: 50°10′56″N 2°22′59″E
- Country: France
- Region: Hauts-de-France
- Department: Somme
- Arrondissement: Amiens
- Canton: Doullens
- Intercommunality: CC Territoire Nord Picardie

Government
  - Mayor (2020–2026): Francis Petit
- Area^{1}: 9.02 km^{2} (3.48 sq mi)
- Elevation: 84 m (276 ft)
- Highest elevation: 159 m (522 ft)
- Lowest elevation: 63 m (207 ft)
- Population (2023): 572
  - Density: 63.4/km^{2} (164/sq mi)
- Time zone: UTC+01:00 (CET)
  - Summer (DST): UTC+02:00 (CEST)
- INSEE/Postal code: 80392 /80600
- ^{1} French Land Register data, which excludes lakes, ponds, glaciers > 1 km^{2} (0.386 sq mi or 247 acres) and river estuaries.

Grouches-Luchuel (French pronunciation: [ɡʁuʃ lyʃɥɛl]; Picard: Grouche-Luchué) is a commune in the Somme department in Hauts-de-France in northern France.

== Geography ==
Situated on the D5 road, some 25 miles (40 km) southwest of Arras. A small stream, a tributary of the Authie, separates the two parts of the commune.

== Population ==
Historical population
| Year | Pop. | ±% p.a. |
|---|---|---|
| 1968 | 345 | — |
| 1975 | 381 | +1.43% |
| 1982 | 395 | +0.52% |
| 1990 | 521 | +3.52% |
| 1999 | 472 | −1.09% |
| 2007 | 567 | +2.32% |
| 2012 | 605 | +1.31% |
| 2017 | 586 | −0.64% |
| 2023 | 572 | −0.40% |
Source: INSEE

== Places of interest ==
- Saint-Brice's chapel at Luchuel
- The church at Grouches

== See also ==
- Communes of the Somme department
