= Sauvillers-Mongival =

- Commune
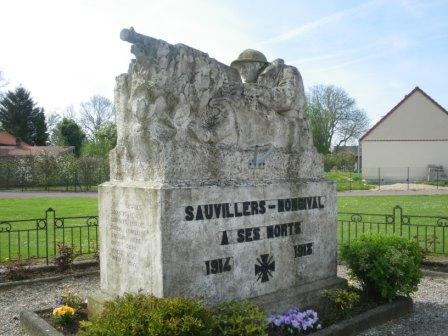
- The war memorial in Sauvillers
- Location of Sauvillers-Mongival
- Location within France Location within Hauts-de-France
- Coordinates: 49°43′32″N 2°28′15″E
- Country: France
- Region: Hauts-de-France
- Department: Somme
- Arrondissement: Montdidier
- Canton: Ailly-sur-Noye
- Intercommunality: CC Avre Luce Noye

Government
  - Mayor (2020–2026): Vincent Wable
- Area^{1}: 5.18 km^{2} (2.00 sq mi)
- Elevation: 110 m (360 ft)
- Highest elevation: 111 m (364 ft)
- Lowest elevation: 49 m (161 ft)
- Population (2023): 178
  - Density: 34.4/km^{2} (89.0/sq mi)
- Time zone: UTC+01:00 (CET)
  - Summer (DST): UTC+02:00 (CEST)
- INSEE/Postal code: 80729 /80110
- ^{1} French Land Register data, which excludes lakes, ponds, glaciers > 1 km^{2} (0.386 sq mi or 247 acres) and river estuaries.

Sauvillers-Mongival is a commune in the Somme department in Hauts-de-France in northern France.

== Geography ==
The commune is situated 16 miles (26 km) southeast of Amiens, on the D83 road.
A rural town mostly given over to agricultural activity, mainly timber, cereals and sugar beet, organised by a farming cooperative. In 1938, there were eleven farms.

== Population ==
Historical population
Year	Pop.	±% p.a.
1968	164	—
1975	133	−2.95%
1982	148	+1.54%
1990	164	+1.29%
1999	179	+0.98%
2007	188	+0.62%
2012	182	−0.65%
2017	175	−0.78%
2023	178	+0.28%
Source: INSEE

== History ==
Mongival was formerly a hamlet, the name coming from the place ruined by the Spaniards during the siege of Corbie in 1636. In 1178, the city was known as Serpentwiler.

Sauvillers-Mongival was first mentioned in the 12th century. The seigneurie was bought in 1393 by the lords of Raineval.

During the First World War, the town was completely flattened, except for three houses. St. Martin's church, rebuilt after 1918, dates back to the 19th century.
In July 1918, the town was liberated by French troops of the 87th infantry regiment. In 1959, a commemorative plate was fixed to one of the walls of the church tower to recall the sacrifice of these soldiers. A war memorial lists the members of the commune that died during World War I.

In the village cemetery are the graves of five British airmen that were shot down nearby in their Lancaster bomber in 1943.

== See also ==
- Communes of the Somme department
