= Saint-Léger-lès-Domart =

- Commune
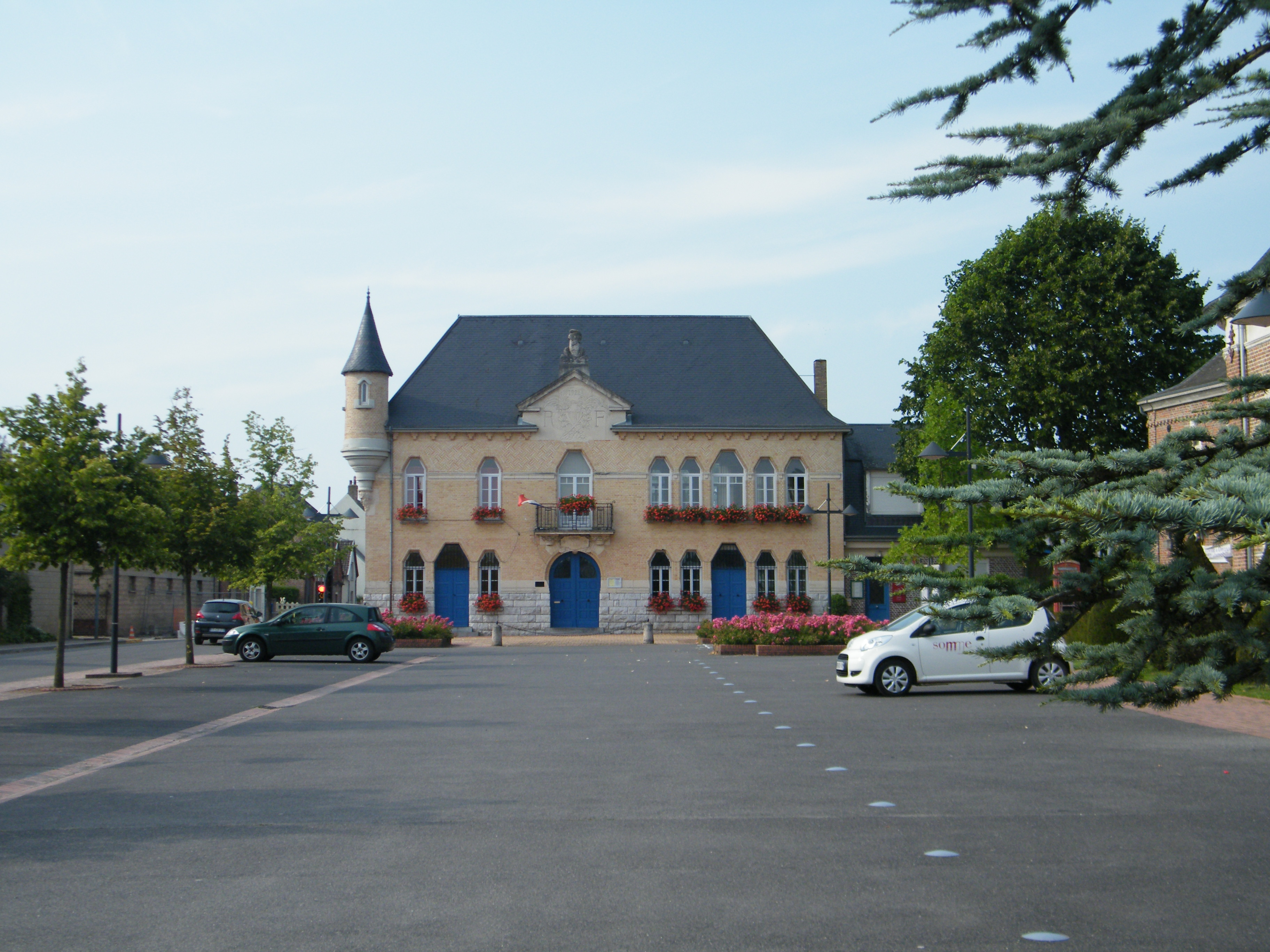
- The town hall in Saint-Léger-lès-Domart

- Coat of arms
- Location of Saint-Léger-lès-Domart
- Location within France Location within Hauts-de-France
- Coordinates: 50°03′00″N 2°08′18″E
- Country: France
- Region: Hauts-de-France
- Department: Somme
- Arrondissement: Amiens
- Canton: Flixecourt
- Intercommunality: CC Nièvre et Somme

Government
  - Mayor (2020–2026): Michel Henry
- Area^{1}: 7.05 km^{2} (2.72 sq mi)
- Elevation: 38 m (125 ft)
- Highest elevation: 131 m (430 ft)
- Lowest elevation: 22 m (72 ft)
- Population (2023): 1,809
  - Density: 257/km^{2} (665/sq mi)
- Time zone: UTC+01:00 (CET)
  - Summer (DST): UTC+02:00 (CEST)
- INSEE/Postal code: 80706 /80780
- ^{1} French Land Register data, which excludes lakes, ponds, glaciers > 1 km^{2} (0.386 sq mi or 247 acres) and river estuaries.

Saint-Léger-lès-Domart (French pronunciation: [sɛ̃ leʒe lɛ dɔmaʁ], literally Saint-Léger near Domart; Picard: Saint-Ngé-lès-Donmart) is a commune in the Somme department in Hauts-de-France in northern France.

== Geography ==
The commune is situated some 10 miles (16 km) northwest of Amiens, on the D12 road.

== Population ==
Historical population
Year	Pop.	±% p.a.
1968	2,126	—
1975	2,105	−0.14%
1982	1,940	−1.16%
1990	1,716	−1.52%
1999	1,758	+0.27%
2007	1,851	+0.65%
2012	1,871	+0.22%
2017	1,855	−0.17%
2023	1,809	−0.42%
Source: INSEE

== See also ==
- Communes of the Somme department
