= Guerbigny =

- Commune
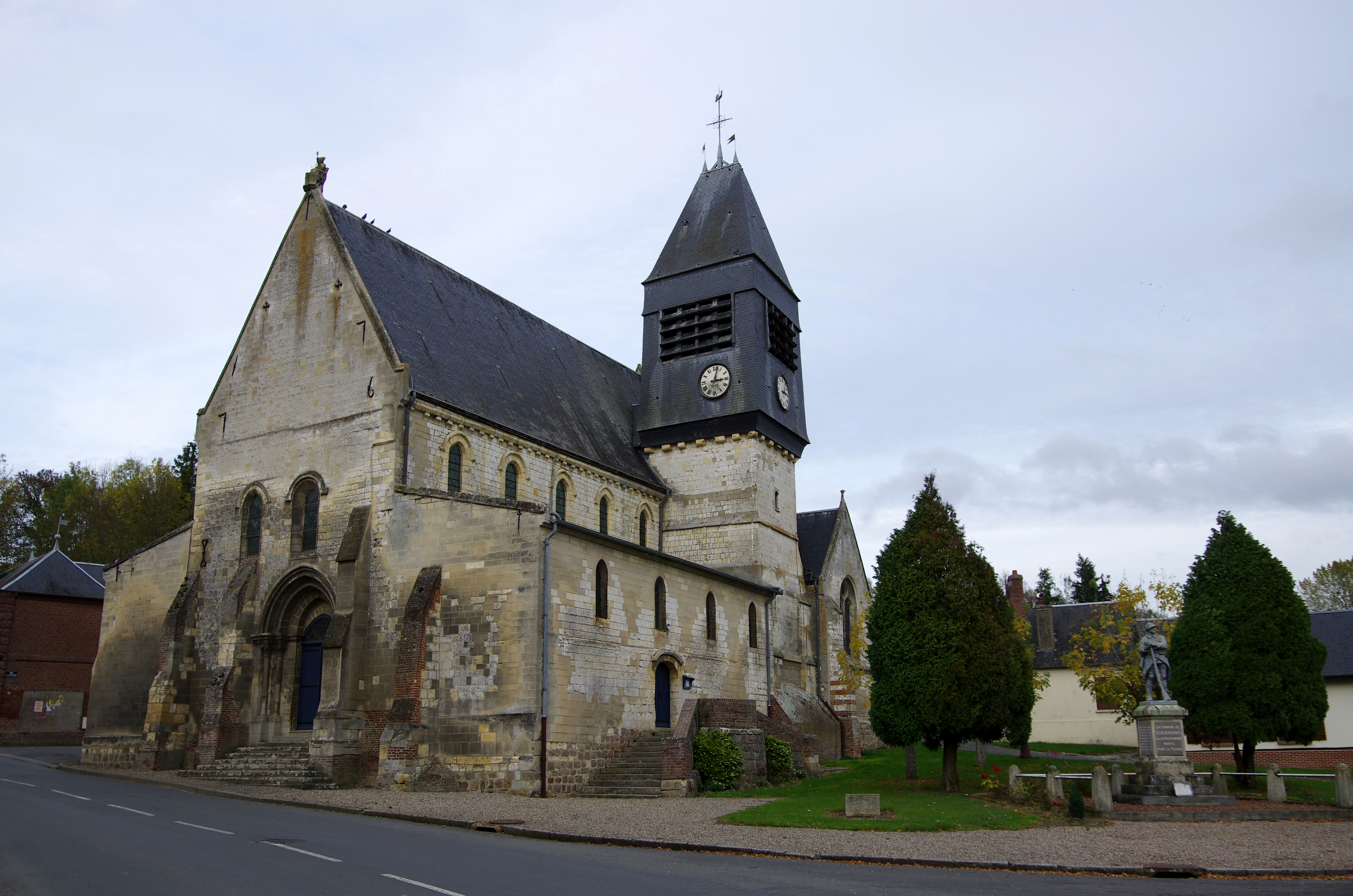
- The church in Guerbigny
- Location of Guerbigny
- Location within France Location within Hauts-de-France
- Coordinates: 49°42′03″N 2°39′40″E
- Country: France
- Region: Hauts-de-France
- Department: Somme
- Arrondissement: Montdidier
- Canton: Roye
- Intercommunality: CC Grand Roye

Government
  - Mayor (2020–2026): Maryline Desprez
- Area^{1}: 8.27 km^{2} (3.19 sq mi)
- Elevation: 92 m (302 ft)
- Highest elevation: 101 m (331 ft)
- Lowest elevation: 52 m (171 ft)
- Population (2023): 275
  - Density: 33.3/km^{2} (86.1/sq mi)
- Time zone: UTC+01:00 (CET)
  - Summer (DST): UTC+02:00 (CEST)
- INSEE/Postal code: 80395 /80500
- ^{1} French Land Register data, which excludes lakes, ponds, glaciers > 1 km^{2} (0.386 sq mi or 247 acres) and river estuaries.

Guerbigny (French pronunciation: [ɡɛʁbiɲi]; Picard: Guérbigny) is a commune in the Somme département in Hauts-de-France in northern France.

== Geography ==
Guerbigny is situated on the D329 road by the banks of the river Avre, some 24 miles (39 km) southeast of Amiens.

== Population ==
Historical population
Year	Pop.	±% p.a.
1968	265	—
1975	256	−0.49%
1982	232	−1.40%
1990	233	+0.05%
1999	233	+0.00%
2007	260	+1.38%
2012	269	+0.68%
2017	293	+1.72%
2023	275	−1.05%
Source: INSEE

== See also ==
- Communes of the Somme department
