= Thézy-Glimont =

- Commune
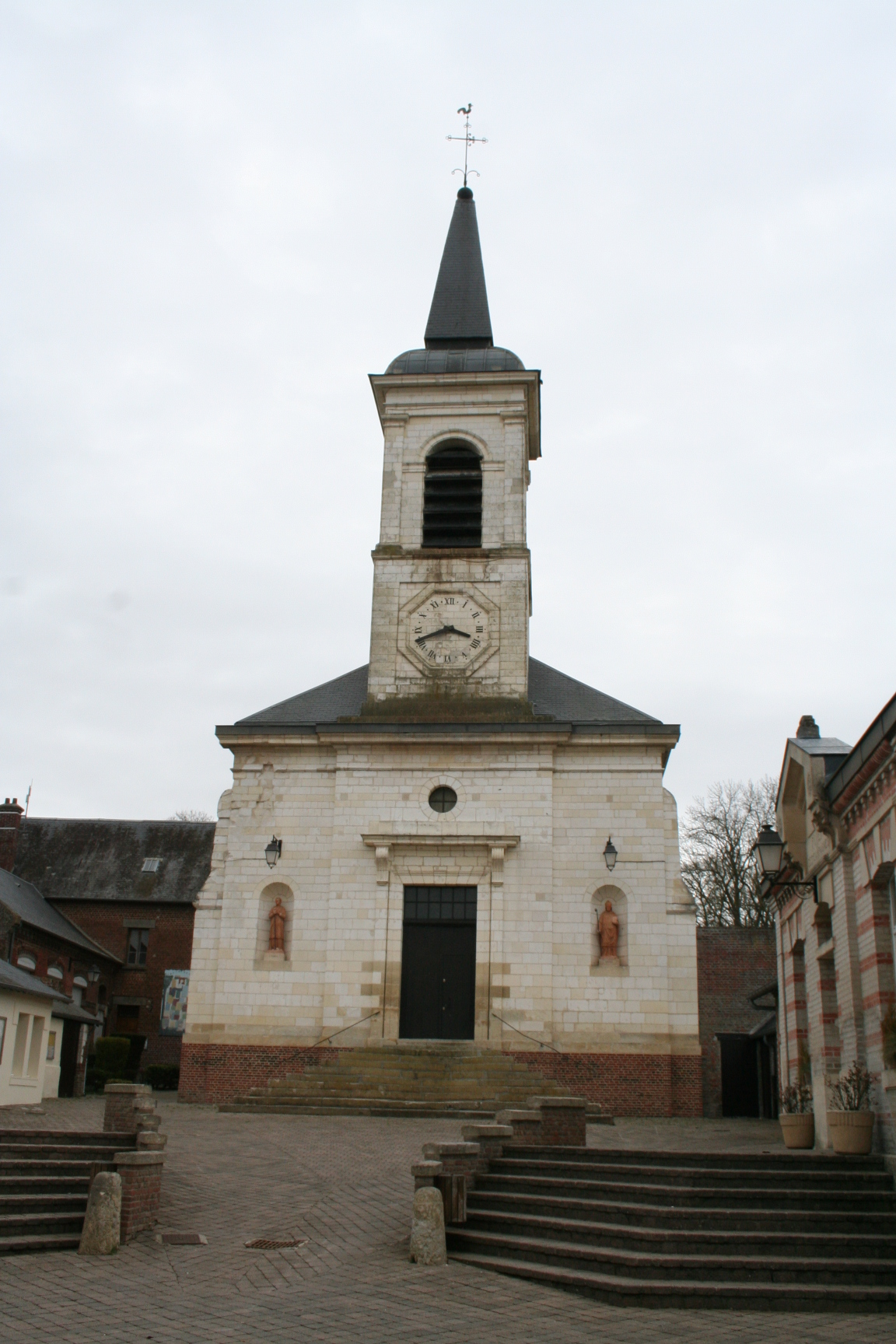
- The church in Thézy-Glimont
- Location of Thézy-Glimont
- Location within France Location within Hauts-de-France
- Coordinates: 49°48′48″N 2°25′52″E
- Country: France
- Region: Hauts-de-France
- Department: Somme
- Arrondissement: Amiens
- Canton: Ailly-sur-Noye
- Intercommunality: Amiens Métropole

Government
  - Mayor (2020–2026): Patrick Desseaux
- Area^{1}: 6.76 km^{2} (2.61 sq mi)
- Elevation: 36 m (118 ft)
- Highest elevation: 114 m (374 ft)
- Lowest elevation: 30 m (98 ft)
- Population (2023): 661
  - Density: 97.8/km^{2} (253/sq mi)
- Time zone: UTC+01:00 (CET)
  - Summer (DST): UTC+02:00 (CEST)
- INSEE/Postal code: 80752 /80440
- ^{1} French Land Register data, which excludes lakes, ponds, glaciers > 1 km^{2} (0.386 sq mi or 247 acres) and river estuaries.

Thézy-Glimont (French pronunciation: [tezi ɡlimɔ̃]) is a commune in the Somme department in Hauts-de-France in northern France.

== Geography ==
The commune is situated 13 kilometres (8 mi) southeast of Amiens, on the D90e road

== Population ==
Historical population
Year	Pop.	±% p.a.
1968	301	—
1975	363	+2.71%
1982	400	+1.40%
1990	457	+1.68%
1999	419	−0.96%
2007	451	+0.92%
2012	509	+2.45%
2017	662	+5.40%
2023	661	−0.03%
Source: INSEE

== See also ==
- Communes of the Somme department
