= Charles-Henri Pourquet =

French sculptor

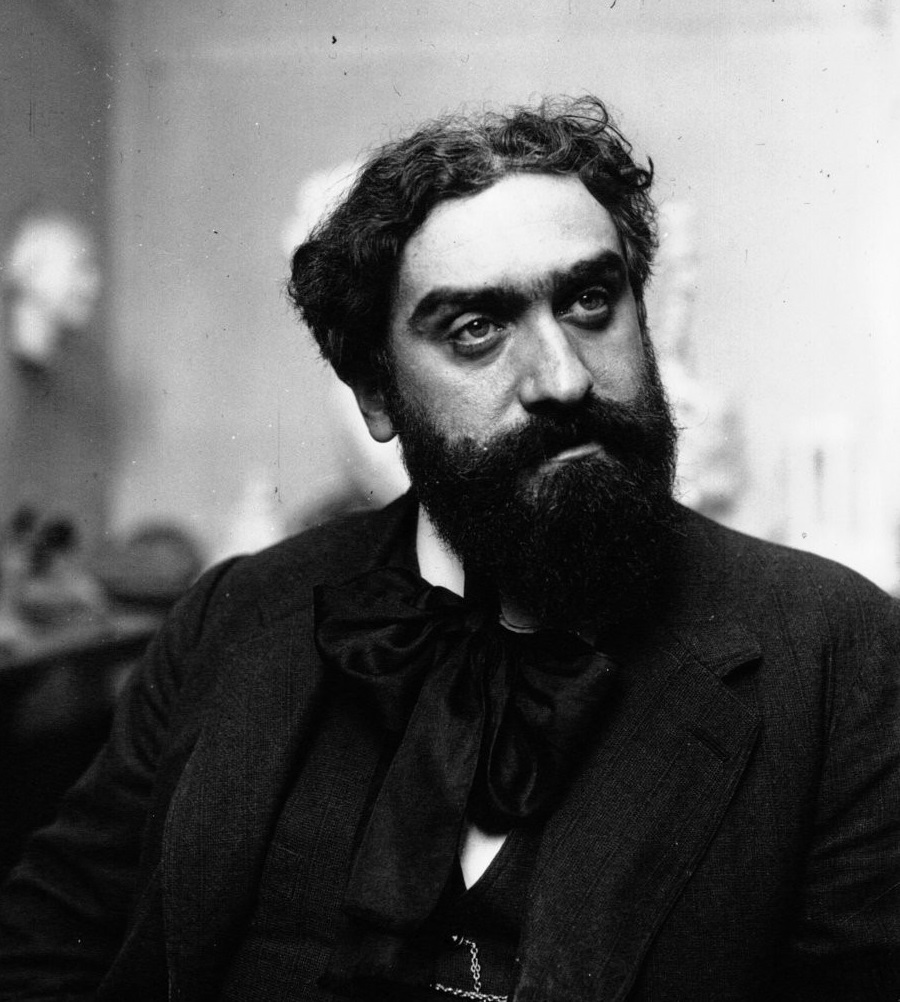
- Pourquet in his studio, 1912
- Born: Henri Charles Justin Pourquet; 14 August 1877; Colombes, France
- Died: 1943
- Occupation: sculptor

Charles-Henri Pourquet, born Henri Charles Justin Pourquet (14 August 1877 – 1943) was a French sculptor.

== Life ==
Born in Colombes, the son of a baker, Pourquet had Nivernais origins and was a student of Louis-Ernest Barrias and Jules Coutan at the École des beaux-arts de Paris. In 1907, he became a member of the Société des artistes français

He was successful after the First World War, with sculptures of Poilus that served as models for many war memorials in France under three different models: Bust, Poilu, and more particularly the one entitled Resistance, of which several hundred copies will be cast by the Fonderie d'art du Val d'Osne.

Among other works, is "Orpheus at the tomb of Eurydice", a bas-relief which will then be acquired by the State for the new National Conservatory of Music, a monument dedicated to Jules Renard in Chitry-les-Mines (Nièvre) where the writer lived as a child, and the Tombeau de la famille Sabaterie, in the Arlanc (Puy-de-Dôme) cemetery. He remarried at the town hall of the 18th arrondissement on 5 November 1921, with Valentine Saint-Selve.

For a long time, Pourquet had his workshop at Les Fusains, an artists community located at 22 rue Tourlaque in Montmartre, in the 18th arrondissement.

== Awards ==
- Chevalier of the Légion d'honneur in 1931.
- Gold medal at the 1929 Salon.

== Salons ==
- Salon des artistes français:
- 1925: Maréchal Sérurier, stone statue, commissioned by the State.
- 1928: Statue de mon jeune ami Jean Le Blond, plaster; Tristesse, terracotta statuette.
- 1935: M. Renaitour, député-maire d'Auxerre, plaster, M. Ortiz, président des Amis de la Légion.

== Works ==
- Chitry: Monument to Jules Renard , destroyed in 1942.
- Lormes: Résistance, Poilu blocking the enemy's way, at the top of the War Memorial.
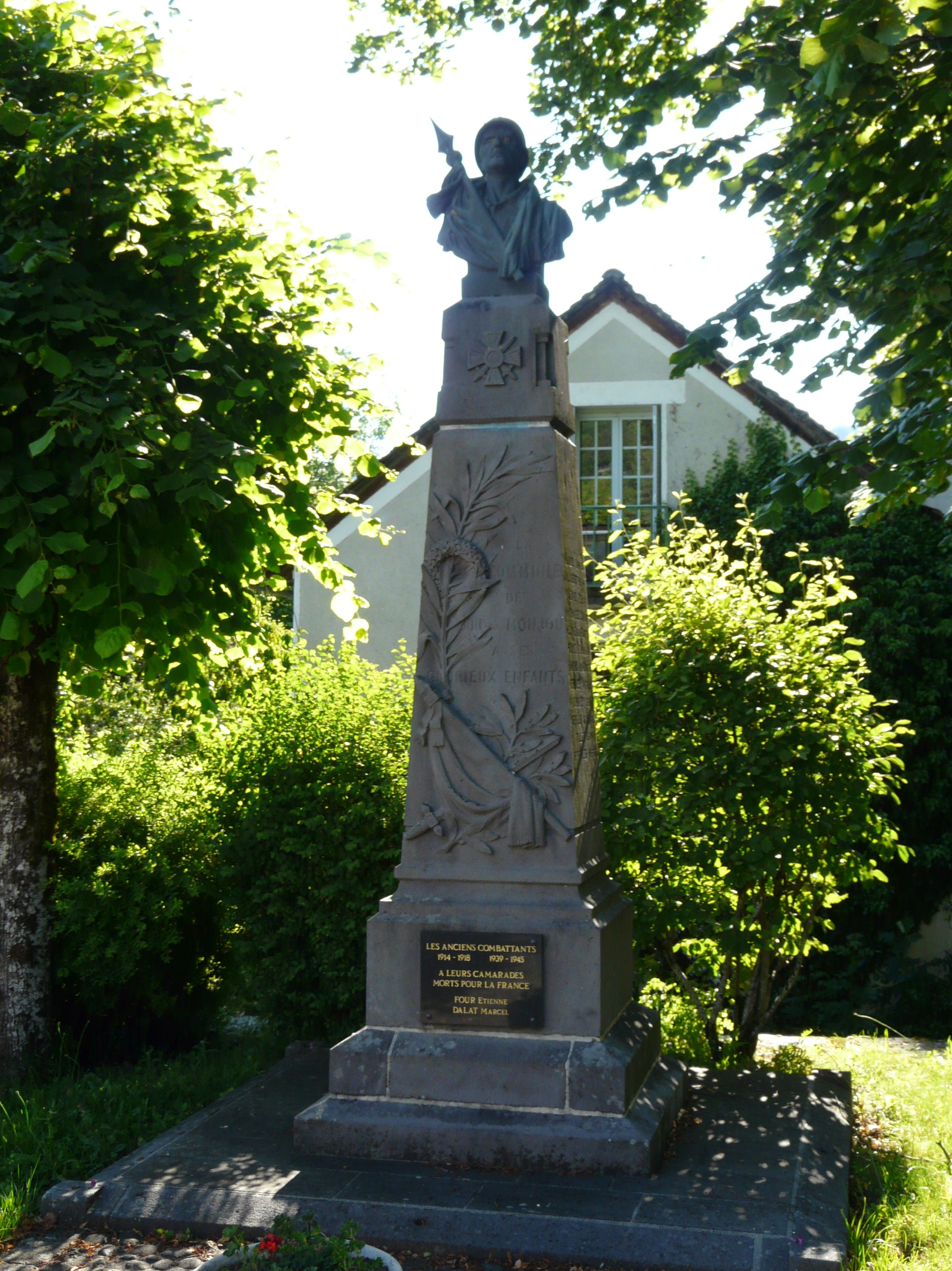
Monument aux morts,
Jou-sous-Monjou.

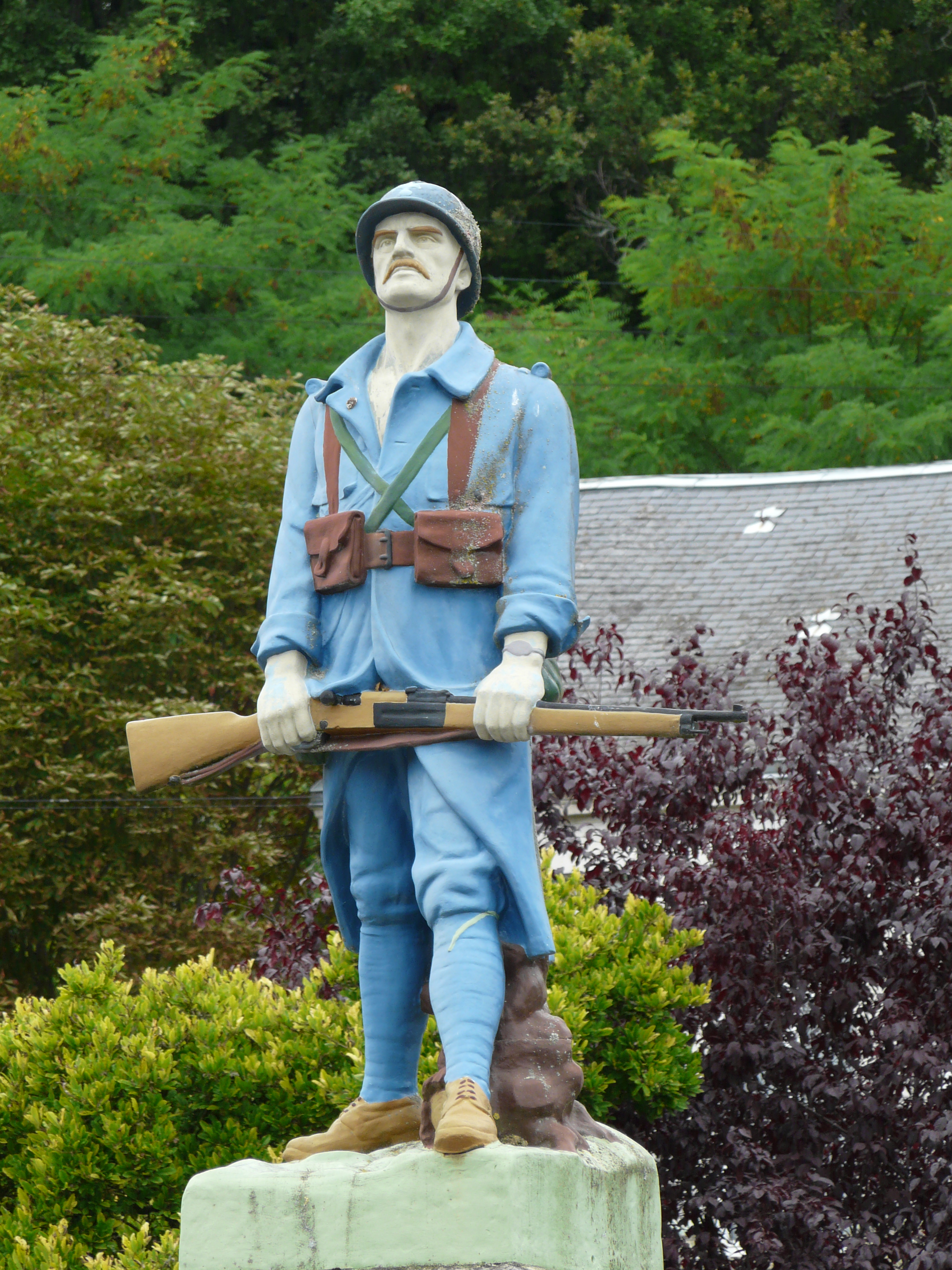
Monument aux morts,
Savignac-les-Églises.

== Critical reception ==
- In May 1919, the magazine L'Art funéraire devoted a complimentary article to him with a photograph on the front page. Each issue, since its publication, has been used to advertise him and describes him as a "statuary of pain".

== Bibliography ==
- Benezit Dictionary of Artists
- André Roussard, Dictionnaire des peintres à Montmartre, Paris, éditions Roussard, 1999, p. 486.
- Bernard Morot-Gaudry, La sculpture en Morvan au XXe siècle et début du XXIe, 2017, Éditions Académie du Morvan, bulletin No. 82, p. 17-18.
- Maurice Le Blond, L'Œuvre de Charles-Henri Pourquet, statuaire, 1921.
