= Chavignon =

- Commune
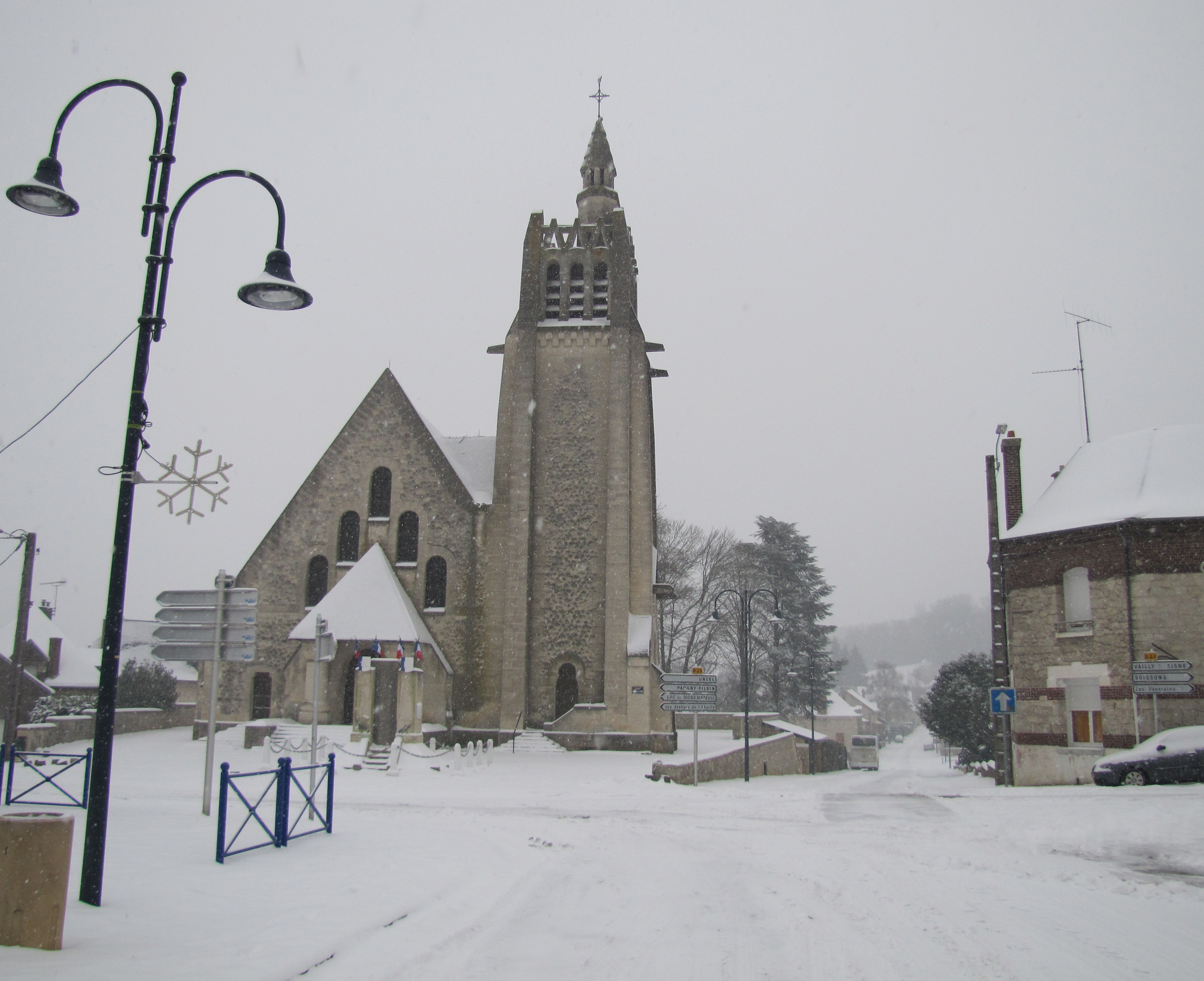
- The church of Chavignon

- Coat of arms
- Location of Chavignon
- Location within France Location within Hauts-de-France
- Coordinates: 49°28′47″N 3°31′19″E
- Country: France
- Region: Hauts-de-France
- Department: Aisne
- Arrondissement: Soissons
- Canton: Fère-en-Tardenois
- Intercommunality: Val de l'Aisne

Government
  - Mayor (2026–32): Patric Kaminski
- Area^{1}: 11.55 km^{2} (4.46 sq mi)
- Elevation: 90 m (300 ft)
- Highest elevation: 195 m (640 ft)
- Lowest elevation: 57 m (187 ft)
- Population (2023): 859
  - Density: 74.4/km^{2} (193/sq mi)
- Time zone: UTC+01:00 (CET)
  - Summer (DST): UTC+02:00 (CEST)
- INSEE/Postal code: 02174 /02000
- ^{1} French Land Register data, which excludes lakes, ponds, glaciers > 1 km^{2} (0.386 sq mi or 247 acres) and river estuaries.

Chavignon (French pronunciation: [ʃaviɲɔ̃]) is a commune in the Aisne department in Hauts-de-France in northern France.

== Geography ==
The river Ailette forms most of the commune's northern border.

== Population ==
Historical population
Year	Pop.	±% p.a.
1968	584	—
1975	572	−0.30%
1982	629	+1.37%
1990	769	+2.54%
1999	793	+0.34%
2007	728	−1.06%
2012	787	+1.57%
2017	818	+0.78%
2023	859	+0.82%
Source: INSEE

== See also ==
- Communes of the Aisne department
